= Peter M. Lansdorp =

Dutch medical researcher

Peter Michael Lansdorp
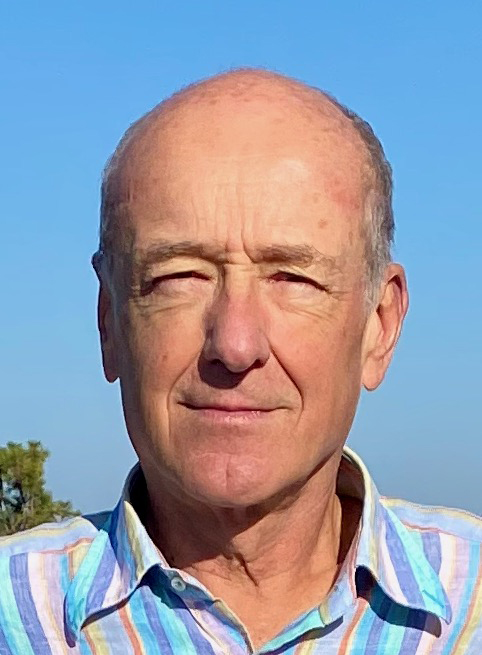
- Born: December 16, 1952 (age 73); Terneuzen, the Netherlands
- Education: Erasmus University (MD), University of Amsterdam (PhD)
- Known for: Discoveries in genome instability, aging and cancer, Development of single cell Strand-seq, Q-FISH, flow FISH techniques, Contributions to telomere biology
- Scientific career
- Fields: Hematology, Medical Genetics, Cancer Research
- Workplaces: Terr Fox Laboratory Terry Fox Laboratory, University of British Columbia, European Research Institute for the Biology of Aging, University of Groningen
- Thesis: (1985)

Peter Michael Lansdorp (born December 16, 1952) is recognized for his contributions in the fields of hematology, medical genetics and cancer research. He has made significant contributions to the understanding of genome instability, particularly in relation to aging and cancer. His research has focused on the biology of blood-forming stem cells, telomeres and genome analysis. He is also known for developing techniques including single cell Strand-seq and fluorescence in situ hybridization (FISH) techniques such as Q-FISH and flow FISH.

== Early life and career ==
Peter Lansdorp grew up in the Netherlands (Den Haag and Wassenaar). He obtained a Medical Degree from the Erasmus University in Rotterdam in 1976 and a PhD from the University of Amsterdam 1985. His early career included work on monoclonal antibodies at Sanquin. He moved to Canada in 1985 and became a Canadian citizen in 2002. Between 2011 and 2017, he was the Founding Scientific Director of the European Research Institute for the Biology of Aging at the University of Groningen, the Netherlands. He returned to Vancouver in 2017, resuming his role as a Distinguished Scientist at the Terry Fox Laboratory and a professor in Medical Genetics at the University of British Columbia.

== Research ==
In 1984, Lansdorp made a significant contribution to the field of monoclonal antibodies with the discovery of a method to efficiently form bifunctional tetrameric antibody complexes.

This method was patented and later licensed to StemCell Technologies in Vancouver. Lansdorp's early work in Vancouver was predominantly focused on human stem cell biology. He first demonstrated that the functional properties of purified "candidate" blood forming stem cells, including their self-renewal properties, change dramatically during development.

He subsequently showed that telomere repeats are lost in purified hematopoietic stem cells with replication and with age supporting the concept that blood stem cells do not truly "self-renew" but are mortal like most other somatic cells. These results are increasingly being recognized worldwide, especially after Lansdorp showed, in collaboration with others, that telomere loss is linked to loss of stem cells in patients.

During a sabbatical in Leiden University in 1995, Lansdorp developed a novel fluorescent in situ hybridization (FISH) method to measure the length of telomere repeats using novel peptide nucleic acid probes - a method which has since enabled numerous studies and observations in the telomere field. He subsequently showed that flow cytometry can be used to measure the average telomere length in nucleated blood cells. This so-called flow FISH technique is now the method of choice to screen for possible telomere biology disorders in humans and such tests are offered by Repeat Diagnostics Inc., a biotech company founded by Lansdorp.

In 2002 Lansdorp provided compelling evidence for the formation of guanine quadruplex (G4) DNA structures in C. elegans. He proposed that a specialised helicase, "deletion of G-rich DNA" or dog-1, is required to unwind G4 DNA structures occasionally forming during replication. The human homolog of the dog-1 gene is BRIP1/FANCJ. These studies provided the first genetic evidence that G4 DNA structures occur in vivo in multicellular organisms and that specialized helicases are required to prevent instability at guanine- rich DNA.

Subsequently, Lansdorp and colleagues identified a previously unknown helicase gene as a major regulator of telomere length in the mouse. He named this gene RTEL for Regulator of Telomere Length. In follow-up work, it was shown that mutations in the human RTEL1 gene result in telomere loss and bone marrow failure.

In 2012, his laboratory introduced the single cell Strand-seq technique, which has diverse applications in genome science, including the production of chromosome-length haplotype information and the characterization of polymorphic inversions.

Continuous refinements of Strand-seq technology have enabled significant advancements in studies of human genome diversity and medical genetics.

In 2022, Lansdorp proposed theories regarding the role of telomerase in suppressing cancer in long-lived animals and levels of telomerase in preimplantation embryos in determining sex differences in average telomere length and lifespan.
