= Single-cell sequencing =

Examines sequence information from individual cells

Single-cell sequencing examines the nucleic acid sequence information from individual cells with optimized next-generation sequencing technologies, providing a higher resolution of cellular differences and a better understanding of the function of an individual cell in the context of its microenvironment. For example, in cancer, sequencing the DNA of individual cells can give information about mutations carried by small populations of cells. In development, sequencing the RNAs expressed by individual cells can give insight into the existence and behavior of different cell types. In microbial systems, a population of the same species can appear genetically clonal. Still, single-cell sequencing of RNA or epigenetic modifications can reveal cell-to-cell variability that may help populations rapidly adapt to survive in changing environments.

== Background ==
A typical human cell contains about 2 x 3.3 billion base pairs of DNA and 600 million mRNA bases. Usually, a mix of millions of cells is used in sequencing the DNA or RNA using traditional methods like Sanger sequencing or next-generation sequencing. By deep sequencing of DNA and RNA from a single cell, cellular functions can be investigated extensively. Like typical next-generation sequencing experiments, single-cell sequencing protocols generally contain the following steps: isolation of a single cell, nucleic acid extraction and amplification, sequencing library preparation, sequencing, and bioinformatic data analysis. It is more challenging to perform single-cell sequencing than sequencing from cells in bulk. The minimal amount of starting materials from a single cell makes degradation, sample loss, and contamination exert pronounced effects on the quality of sequencing data. In addition, due to the picogram level of the number of nucleic acids used, heavy amplification is often needed during sample preparation of single-cell sequencing, resulting in uneven coverage, noise, and inaccurate quantification of sequencing data.

Recent technical improvements make single-cell sequencing a promising tool for approaching a set of seemingly inaccessible problems. For example, heterogeneous samples, rare cell types, cell lineage relationships, mosaicism of somatic tissues, analyses of microbes that cannot be cultured, and disease evolution can all be elucidated through single-cell sequencing. Single-cell sequencing was selected as the method of the year 2013 by Nature Publishing Group.

== Genome (DNA) sequencing ==
Single-cell DNA genome sequencing involves isolating a single cell, amplifying the whole genome or region of interest, constructing sequencing libraries, and then applying next-generation DNA sequencing (for example Illumina, Ion Torrent). Single-cell DNA sequencing has been widely applied in mammalian systems to study normal physiology and disease. Single-cell resolution can uncover the roles of genetic mosaicism or intra-tumor genetic heterogeneity in cancer development or treatment response. In the context of microbiomes, a genome from a single unicellular organism is referred to as a single amplified genome (SAG). Advancements in single-cell DNA sequencing have enabled collecting of genomic data from uncultivated prokaryotic species present in complex microbiomes. Although SAGs are characterized by low completeness and significant bias, recent computational advances have achieved the assembly of near-complete genomes from composite SAGs. Data obtained from microorganisms might establish processes for culturing in the future. Some of the genome assembly tools used in single-cell sequencing include SPAdes, IDBA-UD, Cortex, and HyDA.

=== Methods ===
This figure illustrates the workflow of single-cell genome sequencing. MDA stands for Multiple Displacement Amplification.

A list of more than 100 different single-cell omics methods has been published.

Multiple displacement amplification (MDA) is a widely used technique, enabling amplifying femtograms of DNA from bacterium to micrograms for sequencing. Reagents required for MDA reactions include: random primers and DNA polymerase from bacteriophage phi29. In 30 degree isothermal reaction, DNA is amplified with included reagents. As the polymerases manufacture new strands, a strand displacement reaction takes place, synthesizing multiple copies from each template DNA. At the same time, the strands that were extended antecedently will be displaced. MDA products result in a length of about 12 kb and ranges up to around 100 kb, enabling its use in DNA sequencing. In 2017, a major improvement to this technique, called WGA-X, was introduced by taking advantage of a thermostable mutant of the phi29 polymerase, leading to better genome recovery from individual cells, in particular those with high G+C content. MDA has also been implemented in a microfluidic droplet-based system to achieve a highly parallelized single-cell whole genome amplification. By encapsulating single-cells in droplets for DNA capture and amplification, this method offers reduced bias and enhanced throughput compared to conventional MDA.

Another common method is MALBAC. As done in MDA, this method begins with isothermal amplification, but the primers are flanked with a "common" sequence for downstream PCR amplification. As the preliminary amplicons are generated, the common sequence promotes self-ligation and the formation of "loops" to prevent further amplification. In contrast with MDA, the highly branched DNA network is not formed. Instead, the loops are denatured in another temperature cycle allowing the fragments to be amplified with PCR. MALBAC has also been implemented in a microfluidic device, but the amplification performance was not significantly improved by encapsulation in nanoliter droplets.

Comparing MDA and MALBAC, MDA results in better genome coverage, but MALBAC provides more even coverage across the genome. MDA could be more effective for identifying SNPs, whereas MALBAC is preferred for detecting copy number variants. While performing MDA with a microfluidic device markedly reduces bias and contamination, the chemistry involved in MALBAC does not demonstrate the same potential for improved efficiency.

A method particularly suitable for the discovery of genomic structural variation is Single-cell DNA template strand sequencing (a.k.a. Strand-seq). Using the principle of single-cell tri-channel processing, which uses joint modelling of read-orientation, read-depth, and haplotype-phase, Strand-seq enables discovery of the full spectrum of somatic structural variation classes ≥200kb in size. Strand-seq overcomes limitations of whole genome amplification based methods for identification of somatic genetic variation classes in single cells, because it is not susceptible against read chimers leading to calling artefacts (discussed in detail in the section below), and is less affected by drop outs. The choice of method depends on the goal of the sequencing because each method presents different advantages.

=== Limitations ===
MDA of individual cell genomes results in highly uneven genome coverage, i.e. relative overrepresentation and underrepresentation of various regions of the template, leading to loss of some sequences. There are two components to this process: a) stochastic over- and under-amplification of random regions; and b) systematic bias against high %GC regions. The stochastic component may be addressed by pooling single-cell MDA reactions from the same cell type, by employing fluorescent in situ hybridization (FISH) and/or post-sequencing confirmation. The bias of MDA against high %GC regions can be addressed by using thermostable polymerases, such as in the process called WGA-X.

Single-nucleotide polymorphisms (SNPs), which are a big part of genetic variation in the human genome, and copy number variation (CNV), pose problems in single-cell sequencing, as well as the limited amount of DNA extracted from a single cell. Due to scant amounts of DNA, accurate analysis of DNA poses problems even after amplification since coverage is low and is susceptible to errors. With MDA, average genome coverage is less than 80% and SNPs that are not covered by sequencing reads will be opted out. In addition, MDA shows a high ratio of allele dropout, not detecting alleles from heterozygous samples. Various SNP algorithms are currently in use but none are specific to single-cell sequencing. MDA with CNV also poses the problem of identifying false CNVs that conceal the real CNVs. To solve this, when patterns can be generated from false CNVs, algorithms can detect and eradicate this noise to produce true variants.

Strand-seq overcomes limitations of methods based on whole genome amplification for genetic variant calling: Since Strand-seq does not require reads (or read pairs) transversing the boundaries (or breakpoints) of CNVs or copy-balanced structural variant classes, it is less susceptible to common artefacts of single-cell methods based on whole genome amplification, which include variant calling dropouts due to missing reads at the variant breakpoint and read chimera. Strand-seq discovers the full spectrum of structural variation classes of at least 200kb in size, including breakage-fusion-bridge cycles and chromothripsis events, as well as balanced inversions, and copy-number balanced or imbalanced translocations." Structural variant calls made by Strand-seq are resolved by chromosome-length haplotype, which provides additional variant calling specificity. As a current limitation, Strand-seq requires dividing cells for strand-specific labelling using bromodeoxyuridine (BrdU), and the method does not detect variants smaller than 200kb in size, such as mobile element insertions.

=== Applications ===
Microbiomes are among the main targets of single-cell genomics due to the difficulty of culturing the majority of microorganisms in most environments. Single-cell genomics is a powerful way to obtain microbial genome sequences without cultivation. This approach has been widely applied on marine, soil, subsurface, organismal, and other types of microbiomes in order to address a wide array of questions related to microbial ecology, evolution, public health and biotechnology potential.

Cancer sequencing is also an emerging application of scDNAseq. Fresh or frozen tumors may be analyzed and categorized with respect to SCNAs, SNVs, and rearrangements quite well using whole-genome DNAS approaches. Cancer scDNAseq is particularly useful for examining the depth of complexity and compound mutations present in amplified therapeutic targets such as receptor tyrosine kinase genes (EGFR, PDGFRA etc.) where conventional population-level approaches of the bulk tumor are not able to resolve the co-occurrence patterns of these mutations within single cells of the tumor. Such overlap may provide redundancy of pathway activation and tumor cell resistance.

== DNA methylome sequencing ==
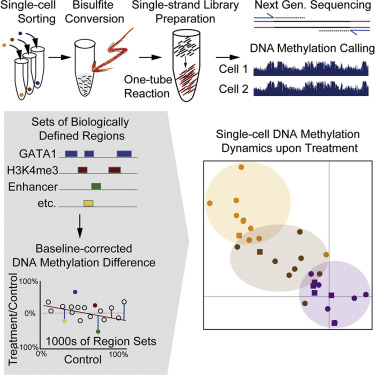
One method for single-cell DNA methylation sequencing.

Single-cell DNA methylome sequencing quantifies DNA methylation. There are several known types of methylation that occur in nature, including 5-methylcytosine (5mC), 5-hydroxymethylcytosine (5hmC), 6-methyladenosine (6mA), and 4-methylcytosine (4mC). In eukaryotes, especially animals, 5mC is widespread along the genome and plays an important role in regulating gene expression by repressing transposable elements. Sequencing 5mC in individual cells can reveal how epigenetic changes across genetically identical cells from a single tissue or population give rise to cells with different phenotypes.

=== Methods ===
Bisulfite sequencing has become the gold standard in detecting and sequencing 5mC in single cells. Treatment of DNA with bisulfite converts cytosine residues to uracil, but leaves 5-methylcytosine residues unaffected. Therefore, DNA that has been treated with bisulfite retains only methylated cytosines. To obtain the methylome readout, the bisulfite-treated sequence is aligned to an unmodified genome. Whole genome bisulfite sequencing was achieved in single cells in 2014. The method overcomes the loss of DNA associated with the typical procedure, where sequencing adapters are added prior to bisulfite fragmentation. Instead, the adapters are added after the DNA is treated and fragmented with bisulfite, allowing all fragments to be amplified by PCR. Using deep sequencing, this method captures ~40% of the total CpGs in each cell. With existing technology DNA cannot be amplified prior to bisulfite treatment, as the 5mC marks will not be copied by the polymerase.

Single-cell reduced representation bisulfite sequencing (scRRBS) is another method. This method leverages the tendency of methylated cytosines to cluster at CpG islands (CGIs) to enrich for areas of the genome with a high CpG content. This reduces the cost of sequencing compared to whole-genome bisulfite sequencing, but limits the coverage of this method. When RRBS is applied to bulk samples, the majority of the CpG sites in gene promoters are detected, but site in gene promoters only account for 10% of CpG sites in the entire genome. In single cells, 40% of the CpG sites from the bulk sample are detected. To increase coverage, this method can also be applied to a small pool of single cells. In a sample of 20 pooled single cells, 63% of the CpG sites from the bulk sample were detected. Pooling single cells is one strategy to increase methylome coverage, but at the cost of obscuring the heterogeneity in the population of cells.

=== Limitations ===
While bisulfite sequencing remains the most widely used approach for 5mC detection, the chemical treatment is harsh and fragments and degrades the DNA. This effect is exacerbated when moving from bulk samples to single cells. Other methods to detect DNA methylation include methylation-sensitive restriction enzymes. Restriction enzymes also enable the detection of other types of methylation, such as 6mA with DpnI. Nanopore-based sequencing also offers a route for direct methylation sequencing without fragmentation or modification to the original DNA. Nanopore sequencing has been used to sequence the methylomes of bacteria, which are dominated by 6mA and 4mC (as opposed to 5mC in eukaryotes), but this technique has not yet been scaled down to single cells.

=== Applications ===
Single-cell DNA methylation sequencing has been widely used to explore epigenetic differences in genetically similar cells. To validate these methods during their development, the single-cell methylome data of a mixed population were successfully classified by hierarchal clustering to identify distinct cell types. Another application is studying single cells during the first few cell divisions in early development to understand how different cell types emerge from a single embryo. Single-cell whole-genome bisulfite sequencing has also been used to study rare but highly active cell types in cancer such as circulating tumor cells (CTCs).

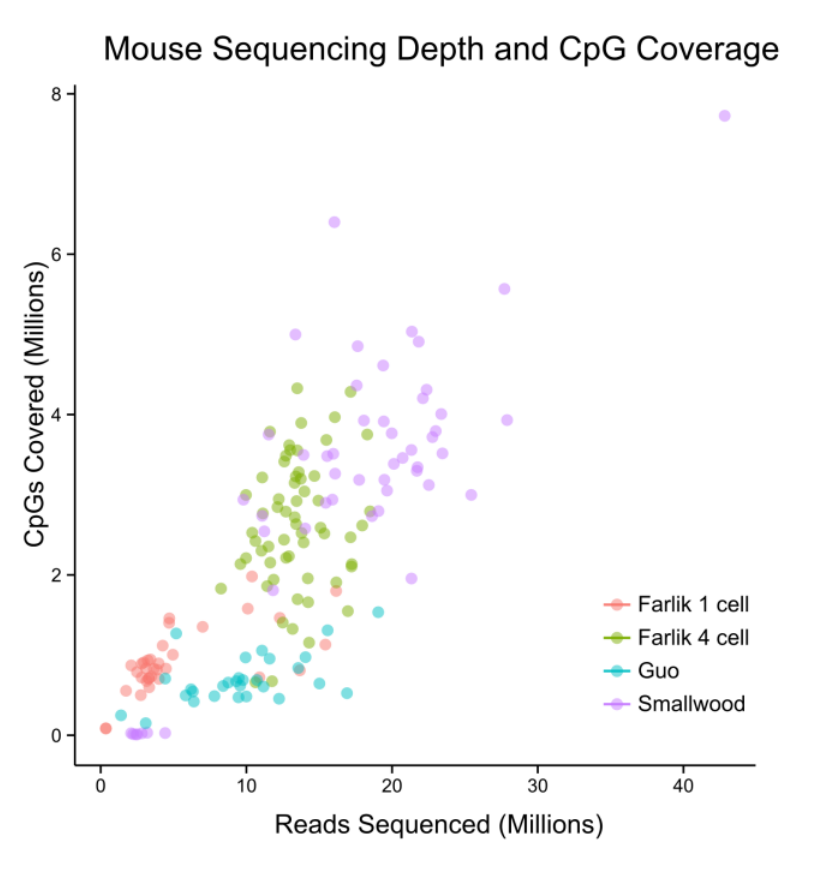
Comparison of single-cell methylation sequencing methods in terms of coverage as at 2015 on Mus musculus

== Transposase-accessible chromatin sequencing (scATAC-seq) ==
Single-cell transposase-accessible chromatin sequencing maps chromatin accessibility across the genome. A transposase inserts sequencing adapters directly into open regions of chromatin, allowing those regions to be amplified and sequenced.

=== Methods ===
The two methods for library preparation in scATAC-Seq are based on split-pool cellular indexing and microfluidics.

== Transcriptome sequencing (scRNA-seq) ==
Standard methods such as microarrays and bulk RNA-seq analyze the RNA expression from large populations of cells. These measurements may obscure critical differences between individual cells in mixed-cell populations.

Single-cell RNA sequencing (scRNA-seq) provides the expression profiles of individual cells and is considered the gold standard for defining cell states and phenotypes as of 2020. Although it is impossible to obtain complete information on every RNA expressed by each cell, due to the small amount of material available, gene expression patterns can be identified through gene clustering analyses. This can uncover rare cell types within a cell population that may never have been seen before. For example, one group of scientists performing scRNA-seq on neuroblastoma tumor tissue identified a rare pan-neuroblastoma cancer cell, which may be attractive for novel therapy approaches.

=== Methods ===
Single-cell RNA sequencing workflow

Current scRNA-seq protocols involve isolating single cells and their RNA, and then following the same steps as bulk RNA-seq: reverse transcription (RT), amplification, library generation and sequencing. Early methods separated individual cells into separate wells; more recent methods encapsulate individual cells in droplets in a microfluidic device, where the reverse transcription reaction takes place, converting RNAs to cDNAs. Each droplet carries a DNA "barcode" that uniquely labels the cDNAs derived from a single cell. Once reverse transcription is complete, the cDNAs from many cells can be mixed together for sequencing, because transcripts from a particular cell are identified by the unique barcode.

Challenges for scRNA-Seq include preserving the initial relative abundance of mRNA in a cell and identifying rare transcripts. The reverse transcription step is critical as the efficiency of the RT reaction determines how much of the cell's RNA population will be eventually analyzed by the sequencer. The processivity of reverse transcriptases and the priming strategies used may affect full-length cDNA production and the generation of libraries biased toward 3' or 5' end of genes.

In the amplification step, either PCR or in vitro transcription (IVT) is currently used to amplify cDNA. One of the advantages of PCR-based methods is the ability to generate full-length cDNA. However, different PCR efficiency on particular sequences (for instance, GC content and snapback structure) may also be exponentially amplified, producing libraries with uneven coverage. On the other hand, while libraries generated by IVT can avoid PCR-induced sequence bias, specific sequences may be transcribed inefficiently, thus causing sequence drop-out or generating incomplete sequences. Several scRNA-seq protocols have been published: Tang et al., STRT, SMART-seq, SORT-seq, CEL-seq, RAGE-seq, Quartz-seq. , and C1-CAGE. These protocols differ in terms of strategies for reverse transcription, cDNA synthesis and amplification, and the possibility to accommodate sequence-specific barcodes (i.e., UMIs) or the ability to process pooled samples.

In 2017, two approaches were introduced to simultaneously measure single-cell mRNA and protein expression through oligonucleotide-labeled antibodies known as REAP-seq, and CITE-seq. Collecting cellular contents following electrophysiological recording using patch-clamp has also allowed development of the Patch-Seq method, which is steadily gaining ground in neuroscience.

==== Example of a droplet based platform - 10X method ====
This platform of single-cell RNA sequencing allows the analysis of transcriptomes on a cell-by-cell basis by the use of microfluidic partitioning to capture single cells and prepare next-generation sequencing (NGS) cDNA libraries. The droplets based platform enables massively parallel sequencing of mRNA in a large numbers of individual cells by capturing single cell in oil droplet.

In the first stage, individual cells are captured separately and lysed, then reverse transcription (RT) of mRNA is performed and cDNA library is obtained. To select mRNA, the RT is performed with a single-stranded sequence of deoxythymine (oligo dT) primer which bind specifically the poly(A) tail of mRNA molecules. Subsequently, the amplified cDNA library is used for sequencing.

The first step of the method is the single-cell encapsulation and library preparation. Cells are encapsulated into Gel Beads-in-emulsion (GEMs) thanks to an automate. To form these vesicle, the automate uses a microfluidic chip and combines all components with oil. Each functional GEM contains a single cell, a single Gel Bead, and RT reagents. On the Gel Bead, olignonucleotides composed by 4 distincts parts are bound: PCR primer (essential for the sequencing); 10X barcoded oligonucleotides; Unique Molecular Identifier (UMI) sequence; PolydT sequence (that enables capture of poly-adenylated mRNA molecules). Within each GEM reaction vesicle, a single cell is lysed and undergoes reverse transcription. cDNA from the same cell are identified thanks to a common 10X barcode. In addition, the number of UMIs express the gene expression level and its analysis enables detection of highly variable genes. Those data are often used for either cellular phenotype classification or new subpopulation identification.

The final step of the platform is the sequencing. Libraries generated can be directly used for single-cell whole transcriptome sequencing or target sequencing workflows. The sequencing is performed by using the Illumina dye sequencing method. This sequencing method is based on sequencing by synthesis (SBS) principle and the use of reversible dye-terminator that enables the identification of each single nucleotid. In order to read the transcript sequences on one end, and the barcode and UMI on the other end, paired-end sequencing readers are required.

The droplet-based platform allows the detection of rare cell types thanks to its high throughput. In fact, 500 to 20,000 cells are captured per sample from a single-cell suspension. The protocol is performed easily and allows a high cell recovery rate of up to 65%. The global workflow of the droplet-based platform takes 8 hours and so is faster than the Microwell-based method (BD Rhapsody), which takes 10 hours. However, it presents some limitations as the need of fresh samples and the final detection of only 10% mRNA.

The major difference between the droplet-based method and the microwell-based method is the technique used for partitioning cells.

=== Limitations ===
Most RNA-seq methods depend on poly(A) tail capture to enrich mRNA and deplete abundant and uninformative rRNA. Thus, they are often restricted to sequencing polyadenylated mRNA molecules. However, recent studies are now starting to appreciate the importance of non-poly(A) RNA, such as long-noncoding RNA and microRNAs in gene expression regulation. Small-seq is a single-cell method that captures small RNAs (<300 nucleotides) such as microRNAs, fragments of tRNAs and small nucleolar RNAs in mammalian cells. This method uses a combination of "oligonucleotide masks" (that inhibit the capture of highly abundant 5.8S rRNA molecules) and size selection to exclude large RNA species such as other highly abundant rRNA molecules. To target larger non-poly(A) RNAs, such as long non-coding mRNA, histone mRNA, circular RNA, and enhancer RNA, size selection is not applicable for depleting the highly abundant ribosomal RNA molecules (18S and 28s rRNA). Single-cell RamDA-Seq is a method that achieves this by performing reverse transcription with random priming (random displacement amplification) in the presence of "not so random" (NSR) primers specifically designed to avoid priming on rRNA molecule. While this method successfully captures full-length total RNA transcripts for sequencing and detected a variety of non-poly(A) RNAs with high sensitivity, it has some limitations. The NSR primers were carefully designed according to rRNA sequences in the specific organism (mouse), and designing new primer sets for other species would take considerable effort. Recently, a CRISPR-based method named scDASH (single-cell depletion of abundant sequences by hybridization) demonstrated another approach to depleting rRNA sequences from single-cell total RNA-seq libraries.

Bacteria and other prokaryotes are currently not amenable to single-cell RNA-seq due to the lack of polyadenylated mRNA. Thus, the development of single-cell RNA-seq methods that do not depend on poly(A) tail capture will also be instrumental in enabling single-cell resolution microbiome studies. Bulk bacterial studies typically apply general rRNA depletion to overcome the lack of polyadenylated mRNA on bacteria, but at the single-cell level, the total RNA found in one cell is too small. Lack of polyadenylated mRNA and scarcity of total RNA found in single bacteria cells are two important barriers limiting the deployment of scRNA-seq in bacteria.

Limitations due to partial and biased scRNA-seq sampling also arise as scRNA-seq only captures a snap shot of cellular activity. For example, in large, ramified cell types like neurons, single-cell isolation only captures RNA from the central cell bodies separated from their processes during trituration. In the brain it is estimated that over 40% of total RNA is in cellular processes such as axons, dendrites, astrocyte end-feet, and thus not visible to scRNA-seq methods.

=== Applications ===
scRNA-Seq is becoming widely used across biological disciplines including Developmental biology, Neurology, Oncology, Immunology, Cardiovascular research, brain disease, and Infectious disease.

Using machine learning methods, data from bulk RNA-Seq has been used to increase the signal/noise ratio in scRNA-Seq. Specifically, scientists have used gene expression profiles from pan-cancer datasets in order to build coexpression networks, and then have applied these on single-cell gene expression profiles, obtaining a more robust method to detect the presence of mutations in individual cells using transcript levels.

Some scRNA-seq methods have also been applied to single-cell microorganisms. SMART-seq2 has been used to analyze single-cell eukaryotic microbes, but since it relies on poly(A) tail capture, it has not been applied in prokaryotic cells. Microfluidic approaches such as Drop-seq and the Fluidigm IFC-C1 devices have been used to sequence single malaria parasites or single yeast cells. The single-cell yeast study sought to characterize the heterogeneous stress tolerance in isogenic yeast cells before and after the yeast are exposed to salt stress. Single-cell analysis of the several transcription factors by scRNA-seq revealed heterogeneity across the population. These results suggest that regulation varies among members of a population to increase the chances of survival for a fraction of the population.

The first single-cell transcriptome analysis in a prokaryotic species was accomplished using the terminator exonuclease enzyme to selectively degrade rRNA and rolling circle amplification (RCA) of mRNA. In this method, the ends of single-stranded DNA were ligated together to form a circle, and the resulting loop was then used as a template for linear RNA amplification. The final product library was then analyzed by microarray, with low bias and good coverage. However, RCA has not been tested with RNA-seq, which typically employs next-generation sequencing. Single-cell RNA-seq for bacteria would be highly useful for studying microbiomes. It would address issues encountered in conventional bulk metatranscriptomics approaches, such as failing to capture species present in low abundance, and failing to resolve heterogeneity among cell populations.

scRNA-Seq has provided considerable insight into the development of embryos and organisms, including the worm Caenorhabditis elegans, and the regenerative planarian Schmidtea mediterranea and axolotl Ambystoma mexicanum. The first vertebrate animals to be mapped in this way were Zebrafish and Xenopus laevis. In each case multiple stages of the embryo were studied, allowing the entire process of development to be mapped on a cell-by-cell basis. Science recognized these advances as the 2018 Breakthrough of the Year.

A molecular cell atlas of mice testes was established to define BDE47-induced prepubertal testicular toxicity using the ScRNA-seq approach, providing novel insight into our understanding of the underlying mechanisms and pathways involved in BDE47-associated testicular injury at a single-cell resolution.

== Considerations ==
=== Isolation of single cells ===
There are several ways to isolate individual cells prior to whole genome amplification and sequencing. Fluorescence-activated cell sorting (FACS) is a widely used approach. Individual cells can also be collected by micromanipulation, for example by serial dilution or by using a patch pipette or nanotube to harvest a single cell. The advantages of micromanipulation are ease and low cost, but they are laborious and susceptible to misidentification of cell types under microscope. Laser-capture microdissection (LCM) can also be used for collecting single cells. Although LCM preserves the knowledge of the spatial location of a sampled cell within a tissue, it is hard to capture a whole single cell without also collecting the materials from neighboring cells. High-throughput methods for single-cell isolation also include microfluidics. Both FACS and microfluidics are accurate, automatic and capable of isolating unbiased samples. However, both methods require detaching cells from their microenvironments first, thereby causing perturbation to the transcriptional profiles in RNA expression analysis.

=== Number of cells to be sequenced and analyzed ===
==== scRNA-Seq ====
The single-cell RNA-Seq protocols vary in efficiency of RNA capture, which results in differences in the number of transcripts generated from each single cell. Single-cell libraries are usually sequenced to a depth of 1,000,000 reads because a large majority of genes are detected with 500,000 reads. Increasing the number of cells and decreasing the read depth increases the power of identifying major cell populations. However, low read depths may not always provide necessary information about the genes, and the difference in their expression between the cell populations is dependent on the stability and detection of the mRNA molecules.

Quality control covariates serve as a strategy to analyze the number of cells. These covariates mainly include filtering based on count depth, the number of genes, and the fraction of counts from mitochondrial genes, which leads to the interpretation of cellular signals.

== See also ==
- DNA sequencing
- Human Cell Atlas
- Disease Cell Atlas
- Single-cell analysis
- Single-cell epigenomics
- Single-cell transcriptomics
- Single-cell multi-omics integration
- Tcr-seq
- Whole genome sequencing
