= List of single cell omics methods =

A list of more than 100 different single cell sequencing (omics) methods have been published. The large majority of methods are paired with short-read sequencing technologies, although some of them are compatible with long read sequencing.

== List ==
Method	Reference	Sequencing Mode	Early Estimate	Late Estimate
Tang method		Short Reads	2008	2009
CyTOF		Short Reads	2011	2012
STRT-seq / C1		Short Reads	2011	2012
SMART-seq		Short Reads	2012	2013
CEL-seq		Short Reads	2012	2013
Quartz-Seq		Short Reads	2012	2013
PMA / SMA		Short Reads	2012	2013
scBS-seq		Short Reads	2013	2014
AbPair		Short Reads	2014	2014
MARS-seq		Short Reads	2014	2015
DR-seq		Short Reads	2014	2015
G&T-seq		Short Reads	2014	2015
SCTG		Short Reads	2014	2015
SIDR-seq		Short Reads	2014	2015
sci-ATAC-seq		Short Reads	2014	2015
Hi-SCL		Short Reads	2015	2015
SUPeR-seq		Short Reads	2015	2015
Drop-Chip		Short Reads	2015	2015
CytoSeq		Short Reads	2015	2016
inDrop		Short Reads	2015	2016
sc-GEM		Short Reads	2015	2016
scTrio-seq		Short Reads	2015	2016
scM&T-seq		Short Reads	2015	2016
PLAYR		Short Reads	2015	2016
Genshaft-et-al-2016		Short Reads	2015	2016
Darmanis-et-al-2016		Short Reads	2015	2016
CRISP-seq		Short Reads	2015	2016
scGESTALT		Short Reads	2015	2016
CEL-Seq2 / C1		Short Reads	2015	2016
STRT-seq-2i		Short Reads	2016	2017
RNAseq @10xgenomics		Short Reads	2016	2017
RNAseq / Gene Expression @nanostringtech		Short Reads	2016	2017
sc Targeted Gene Expression @fluidigm		Short Reads	2016	2017
scTCR Wafergen		Short Reads	2016	2017
CROP-seq		Short Reads	2016	2017
SiC-seq		Short Reads	2016	2017
mcSCRB-seq		Short Reads	2016	2017
Patch-seq		Short Reads	2016	2017
Geo-seq		Short Reads	2016	2017
scNOMe-seq		Short Reads	2016	2017
scCOOL-seq		Short Reads	2016	2017
CUT&Run		Short Reads	2016	2017
MATQ-seq		Short Reads	2016	2017
Quartz-Seq2		Short Reads	2017	2018
Seq-Well		Short Reads	2017	2018
DroNC-Seq		Short Reads	2017	2018
sci-RNA-seq		Short Reads	2017	2018
scATAC @10xgenomics		Short Reads	2017	2018
scVDJ @10xgenomics		Short Reads	2017	2018
scNMT triple omics		Short Reads	2017	2018
SPLIT-seq Parse Biosciences		Short Reads	2017	2018
CITE-Seq		Short Reads	2017	2018
scMNase-seq		Short Reads	2017	2018
Chaligne-et-al-2018		Short Reads	2017	2018
LINNAEUS		Short Reads	2017	2018
TracerSeq		Short Reads	2017	2018
CellTag		Short Reads	2017	2018
ScarTrace		Short Reads	2017	2018
scRNA-Seq Dolomite Bio		Short Reads	2017	2018
Trac-looping		Short Reads	2017	2018
Perturb-ATAC		Short Reads	2018	2019
scMethylation		Short Reads	2018	2019
scHiC		Short Reads	2018	2019
Multiplex Droplet scRNAseq		Short Reads	2018	2019
sci-CAR		Short Reads	2018	2019
C1 CAGE single cell		Short Reads	2018	2019
sc paired microRNA-mRNA		Short Reads	2018	2019
scCAT-seq		Short Reads	2018	2019
REAP-seq @fluidigm		Short Reads	2018	2019
scCC		Short Reads	2018	2019
yscRNA-SEQ		Short Reads	2018	2019
TARGET-seq		Short Reads	2018	2019
MULTI-seq		Short Reads	2018	2019
snRNA-seq		Short Reads	2018	2019
sci-RNA-seq3		Short Reads	2018	2019
BRIF-seq		Short Reads	2018	2019
Drop-seq Dolomite Bio		Short Reads	2018	2019
Slide-seq		Short Reads	2018	2019
CUT&Tag		Short Reads	2018	2019
CellTagging		Short Reads	2018	2019
DART-Seq		Short Reads	2018	2019
scDamID&T		Short Reads	2018	2019
ACT-seq		Short Reads	2018	2019
Sci-Hi-C		Short Reads	2018	2019
Slide-seq		Short Reads	2018	2019
Simplified-Drop-seq		Short Reads	2018	2019
scChIC-seq		Short Reads	2018	2019
Dip-C		Short Reads	2018	2019
CoBATCH		Short Reads	2018	2019
Convert-seq		Short Reads	2018	2019
Droplet-based scATAC-seq		Short Reads	2018	2019
ECCITE-seq		Short Reads	2018	2019
dsciATAC-seq		Short Reads	2018	2019
CLEVER-seq		Short Reads	2018	2019
scISOr-Seq		Short Reads	2018	2019
MARS-seq2.0		Short Reads	2018	2019
nano-NOMe		Long Reads	2018	2019
MeSMLR-seq		Long Reads	2018	2019
SMAC-seq		Long Reads	2018	2019
MoonTag/SunTag		Short Reads	2018	2019
SCoPE2		Short Reads	2018	2019
sci-fate		Short Reads	2018	2019
μDamID		Short Reads	2018	2019
Methyl-HiC		Short Reads	2018	2019
RAGE-seq		Long Reads	2018	2019
Paired-Seq		Short Reads	2018	2019
Tn5Prime		Short Reads	2018	2019
NanoPARE		Short Reads	2018	2019
BART-Seq		Short Reads	2018	2019
scDam&T-seq		Short Reads	2018	2019
itChIP-seq		Short Reads	2018	2019
SNARE-seq		Short Reads	2018	2019
ASTAR-seq		Short Reads	2018	2019
sci-Plex		Short Reads	2018	2019
MIX-Seq		Short Reads	2018	2019
microSPLiT		Short Reads	2018	2019
PAIso-seq		Short Reads	2018	2019
FIN-Seq		Short Reads	2018	2019
LIBRA-seq		Short Reads	2018	2019
scifi-RNA-seq		Short Reads	2018	2019
plexDIA		Short Reads	2021	2021
scGET-seq		Short Reads	2022	2022
MPX		Short Reads	2023	2023
