= Φ29 DNA polymerase =

Enzyme from bacteriophage ϕ29

DNA polymerase

Identifiers
- Organism: Bacillus phage phi29
- Symbol: 2
- Orthologs: OMA: entry
- UniProt: P03680
Search for
- Structures: Swiss-model
- Domains: InterPro

DNA polymerase type B, organellar and viral, phi29-like

Identifiers
- Symbol: DNA_pol_B_2
- Pfam: PF03175
- InterPro: IPR014416
- SCOP2: 2py5 / SCOPe / SUPFAM
Available protein structures:
- PDB: IPR014416 PF03175 (ECOD; PDBsum)
- AlphaFold: IPR014416; PF03175

Φ29 DNA polymerase is an enzyme from the bacteriophage Φ29. It is being increasingly used in molecular biology for multiple displacement DNA amplification procedures, and has a number of features that make it particularly suitable for this application. It was discovered and characterized by Spanish scientists Luis Blanco and Margarita Salas.

== Φ29 DNA replication ==
Φ29 is a bacteriophage of Bacillus subtilis with a sequenced, linear, 19,285 base pair DNA genome. Each 5' end is covalently linked to a terminal protein, which is essential in the replication process by acting as a primer for the viral DNA polymerase. A symmetrical mode of replication has been suggested, whereby protein-primed initiation occurs non-simultaneously from either end of the chromosome; this involves two replication origins and two distinct polymerase monomers. Synthesis is continual and involves a strand displacement mechanism. This was demonstrated by the ability of the enzyme to continue to copy the singly primed circular genome of the M13 phage more than tenfold in a single strand (over 70kb in a single strand). In vitro experiments have shown that Φ29 replication can proceed to completion with the sole phage protein requirements of the polymerase and the terminal protein. The polymerase catalyses the formation of the initiation complex between the terminal protein and the chromosome ends at an adenine residue. From here, continual synthesis can occur.

== The polymerase ==
The polymerase is a monomeric protein with two distinct functional domains. Site-directed mutagenesis experiments support the proposition that this protein displays a structural and functional similarity to the Klenow fragment of the Escherichia coli Polymerase I enzyme; it comprises a C-terminal polymerase domain and a spatially separated N-terminal domain with a 3'-5' exonuclease activity.

The isolated enzyme has no intrinsic helicase activity but may carry out an equivalent function by way of its strong binding to single stranded DNA, particularly in preference to double stranded nucleic acid. This is the property of this enzyme that makes is favorably applicable to Multiple Displacement Amplification. The enzyme facilitates the "debranching" of double stranded DNA. Deoxyribonucleoside triphosphate cleavage that occurs as part of the polymerization process probably supplies the energy required for this unwinding mechanism. The continuous nature of strand synthesis (compared to the asymmetric synthesis seen in other organisms) probably contributes to this enhanced processivity. Proofreading activity conferred by the exonuclease domain was demonstrated by showing the preferential excision of a mismatched nucleotide from the 3' terminus of the newly synthesized strand. The exonuclease activity of the enzyme is, like its polymerization activity, highly processive and can degrade single-stranded oligonucleotides without dissociation. Co-operation or a 'delicate competition' between these two functional domains is essential, so as to ensure accurate elongation at an optimal rate. The exonuclease activity of the enzyme does impede its polymerization capacity; inactivation of the exonuclease activity by site-directed mutagenesis meant that a 350 fold lower dNTP concentration was required to achieve the same rates of primer elongation seen in the wild type enzyme.

== Whole genome amplification ==
Φ29 polymerase enzyme is already used in multiple displacement amplification (MDA) procedures (including in a number of commercial kits) whereby fragments tens of kilobases in length can be produced from non-specific hexameric primers annealing at intervals along the genome. The enzyme has many desirable properties that make it appropriate for whole genome amplification (WGA) by this method.

- High processivity.
- Proofreading activity. It is believed to be 1 or 2 orders of magnitude less error prone than Taq polymerase.
- Generates large fragments, over 10kb.
- Produces more DNA than PCR-based methods, by about an order of magnitude.
- Requires minimal amount of template; 10 ng suffices.
- Novel replication mechanism; multiple-strand displacement amplification.
  - Random primers (hexamers) can be used, no need to design specific primers/target specific regions.
  - No need for thermal cycling.
- Good coverage and a reduced amplification bias when compared to PCR-based approaches. There is speculation that it is the least biased of the WGA methods in use.
