= Flow-FISH =

Cytogenetic technique

Flow-FISH (fluorescence in-situ hybridization) is a cytogenetic technique to quantify the copy number of RNA or specific repetitive elements in genomic DNA of whole cell populations via the combination of flow cytometry with cytogenetic fluorescence in situ hybridization staining protocols.

Flow-FISH is most commonly used to quantify the length of telomeres, which are stretches of repetitious DNA (hexameric TTAGGG repeats) at the distal ends of chromosomes in human white blood cells, and a semi-automated method for doing so was published in Nature Protocols. Telomere length in white blood cells has been a subject of interest because telomere length in these cell types (and also of other somatic tissues) declines gradually over the human lifespan, resulting in cell senescence, apoptosis, or transformation. This decline has been shown to be a surrogate marker for the concomitant decline in the telomere length of the hematopoietic stem cell pool, with the granulocyte lineage giving the best indication, presumably due to the absence of a long lived memory subtype and comparatively rapid turnover of these cells.

Flow-FISH is also suitable for the concomitant detection of RNA and protein. This allows for the identification of cells that not only express a gene, but also translate it into protein. This type of Flow-FISH has been used to study latent infection of viruses such as HIV-1 and EBV, but also to track single cell gene expression and translation into protein.

== Q-FISH to flow-FISH ==
Flow-FISH was first published in 1998 by Rufer et al. as a modification of another technique for analyzing telomere length, Q-FISH, that employs peptide nucleic acid probes of a 3'-CCCTAACCCTAACCCTAA-5' sequence labeled with a fluorescin fluorophore to stain telomeric repeats on prepared metaphase spreads of cells that have been treated with colcemid, hypotonic shock, and fixation to slides via methanol/acetic acid treatment Images of the resultant fluorescent spots could then be analyzed via a specialized computer program to yield quantitative fluorescence values that can then be used to estimate actual telomere length. The fluorescence yielded by probe staining is considered to be quantitative because PNA binds preferentially to DNA at low ionic salt concentrations and in the presence of formamide, thus the DNA duplex may not reform once it has been melted and annealed to PNA probe, allowing the probe to saturate its target repeat sequence (as it is not displaced from the target DNA by competing anti sense DNA on the complementary strand), thus yielding a reliable and quantifiable readout of the frequency of PNA probe target at a given chromosomal site after washing away of unbound probe.

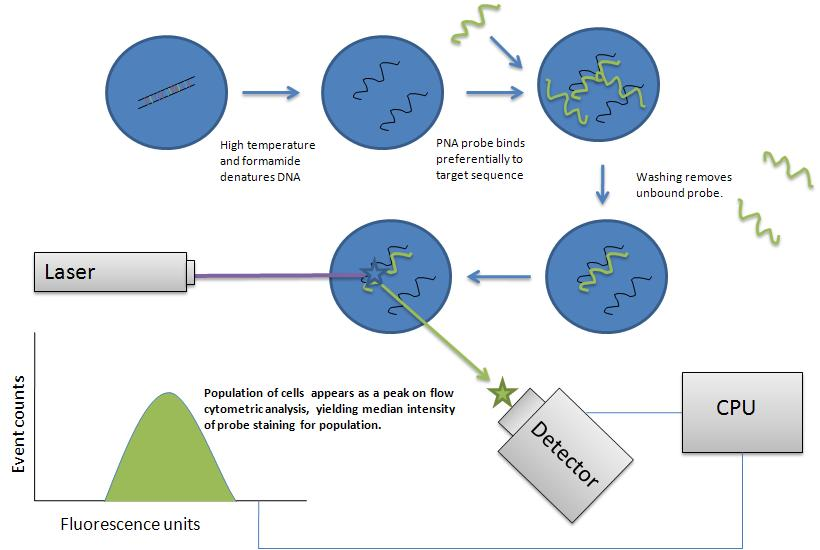
DNA is denatured via heat and formamide treatment, PNA probe is allowed to hybridize, excess probe is washed away, reading is taken in flow cytometer

=== Innovation ===
Unlike Q-FISH, Flow-FISH utilizes the quantitative properties of telomere specific PNA probe retention to quantify median fluorescence in a population of cells, via the use of a flow cytometer, instead of a fluorescence microscope. The primary advantage of this technique is that it eliminates the time required in Q-FISH to prepare metaphase spreads of cells of interest, and that flow cytometric analysis is also considerably faster than the methods required to acquire and analyze Q-FISH prepared slides. Flow-FISH thus allows for a higher throughput analysis of telomere length in blood leukocytes, which are a readily available form of human tissue sample. The most recent versions of the flow-FISH technique include an internal control population of cow thymocytes with a known telomere length detected by TRF or telomere restriction fragment analysis to which the fluorescence of a given unknown sample may be compared. Because cow thymocytes take up LDS751 dye to a lesser extent than their human counterparts, they may be reliably differentiated via plotting and gating the desired populations. Other cell types that have not in the past proven to be good candidates for flow-FISH can be analyzed via extraction of nuclei and performance of the technique on them directly.

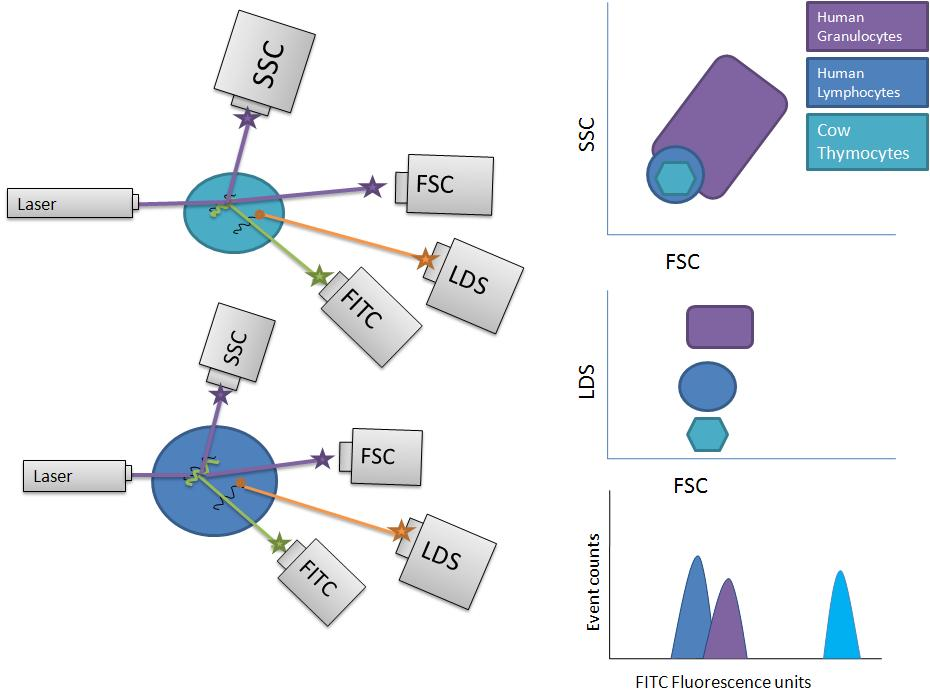
Multiparametric analysis allows for differentiation of cell types within one sample, allowing for internal control, and analysis of leukocyte subtypes.
