= Q-FISH =

Cytogenetic technique

Quantitative Fluorescent in situ hybridization (Q-FISH) is a cytogenetic technique based on the traditional FISH methodology. In Q-FISH, the technique uses labelled (Cy3 or FITC) synthetic DNA mimics called peptide nucleic acid (PNA) oligonucleotides to quantify target sequences in chromosomal DNA using fluorescent microscopy and analysis software. Q-FISH is most commonly used to study telomere length, which in vertebrates are repetitive hexameric sequences (TTAGGG) located at the distal end of chromosomes. Telomeres are necessary at chromosome ends to prevent DNA-damage responses as well as genome instability. To this day, the Q-FISH method continues to be utilized in the field of telomere research.

== PNAs and FISH ==
Due to the fact that PNA backbones contain no charged phosphate groups, binding between PNA and DNA is stronger than that of DNA/DNA or DNA/RNA duplexes. Q-FISH utilizes this unique characteristic of PNAs where at low ionic strengths, PNAs can anneal to complementary single-stranded DNA sequences while single-stranded DNA cannot. By using conditions that only allow labeled (CCCTAA)_{3} PNA to hybridize to (TTAGGG)_{n} target sequences, Q-FISH is able to quantify the hybridization of PNAs to telomeric sequences.

== General method/protocol for cultured cells ==
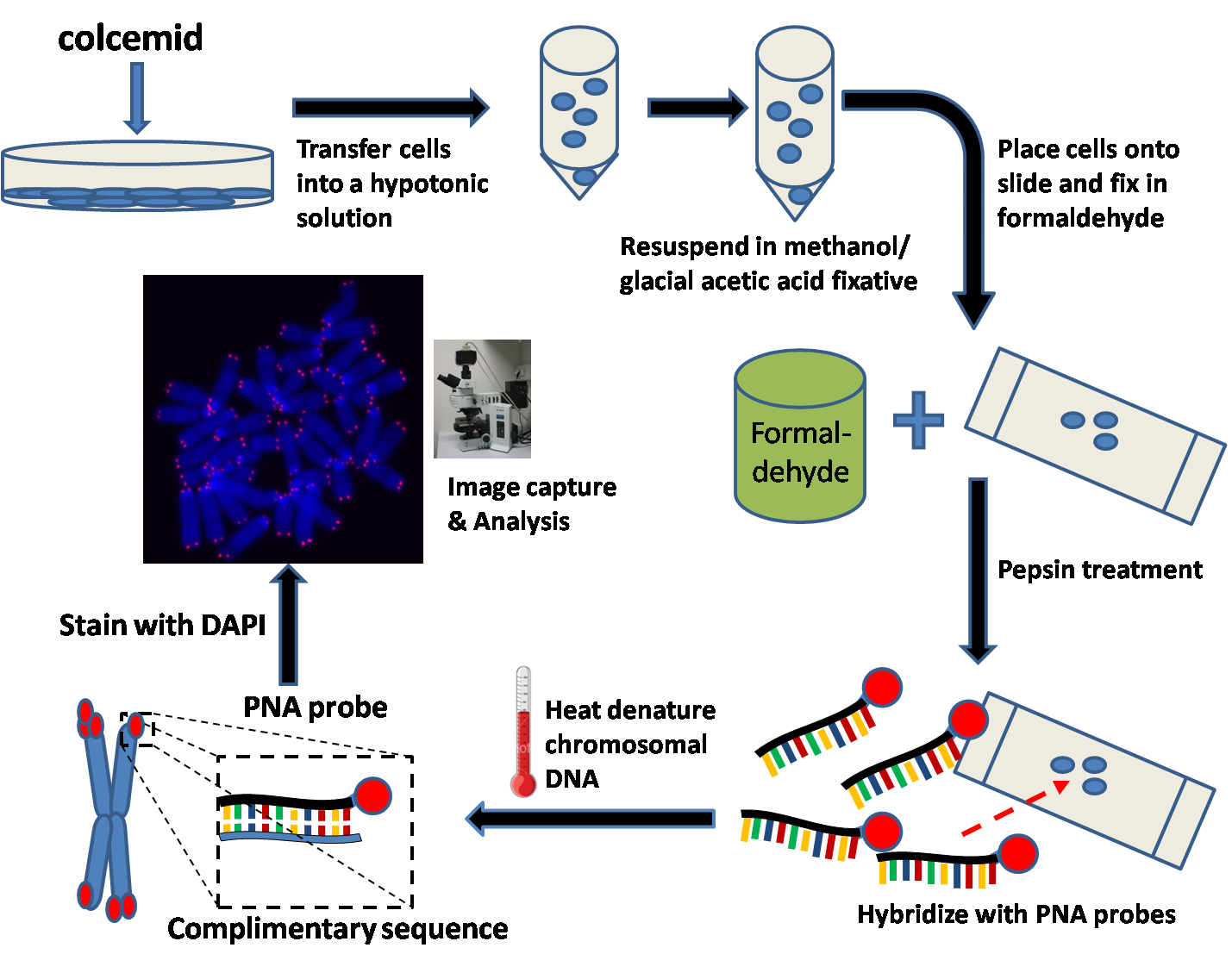
Basic workflow of Q-FISH.

=== Prepare metaphase-arrested cells ===
Several hours prior to harvesting the cultured cells, colcemid is added to the culture medium. Colcemid acts to arrest cells in the metaphase state by disrupting microtubules in mitotic cells. Cells are then trypsinized and resuspended in a hypotonic buffer. This will swell the collected cells and spread the chromosomes.

=== Fix cells ===
The hypotonic solution is then removed by centrifugation and resuspended in a methanol/glacial acetic acid fixative.

=== Prepare slides ===
Place a few drops of the cell suspension onto a microscope slide and let air dry overnight. The following day, immerse the slide in phosphate buffered saline (PBS) for several minutes.

=== Fix slides in formaldehyde ===
Transfer the slides into a 4% formaldehyde solution and fix for several minutes. Wash slides several times with PBS.

=== Treat slides with pepsin ===
Slides are then transferred into a pepsin solution. Pepsin is a protease and acts to digest proteins into peptides.

=== Hybridize PNA probe (Cy3 or FITC labelled PNAs) ===
A small volume of the hybridization mixture is placed onto a coverslip and then placed gently onto the microscope slide which contains the fixed cells.

=== Heat denature DNA ===
The slide is then placed into a preheated oven where the chromosomal DNA in the cell is denatured at 80 °C for several minutes. The slide is then left at room temperature for several hours to allow the PNA to hybridize to complementary DNA.

=== Wash slides to remove unbound PNAs and counterstain DNA (DAPI or PI) ===
Slides are then carefully washed in various wash solutions to remove unbound PNA. Microscope mounting medium is then placed onto the cells. This medium generally contains DAPI (a DNA counterstain) and an antifade solution to preserve the PNA fluorescence and reduce photobleaching.

=== Image capture and analysis ===
Before experimental samples are imaged, fluorescent reference beads are imaged in order to ensure the proper set-up of the camera and fluorescent microscope. In addition, these reference beads will be imaged prior to every acquisition session. This will ensure that the differences between samples are not due to errors in the lamp or camera. A metaphase cell is then manually selected and centered for the camera. Two types of images are taken: pictures of the stained chromosomes in their metaphase state and fluorescent images of the telomeres. The two images can then be superimposed to generate a combined image. This image can then be karyotyped or assigned nomenclature. Furthermore, the intra-chromosomal distribution of telomere length in p-arms versus q-arms can be measured.

Data from different experiments may be used to normalize the fluorescence intensity while plasmids with a known number of telomeric repeats can be used as standards to help relate telomere fluorescence and telomere length. In addition to the fluorescent reference beads, signal strength from sister chromatids should be equal and therefore can be used as another control to gauge the precision of the data. Lastly, it is important the images are not saturated. If the fluorescence intensity reaches saturation, telomere lengths become underestimated. Q-FISH image analysis software is available for free from the Flintbox Network at .

== Applications and significance ==
Q-FISH has been used extensively to quantitate information regarding telomere length distribution and associating it with various illnesses. In this context, Q-FISH is particularly relevant because it is able to detect and quantify critically short telomeres. It has been shown that it is the frequency of these critically short telomeres, rather than the average telomere length, that is important in telomere dysfunction.

While Q-FISH supplies accurate information about telomere length, its relevance can be extended by combining Q-FISH with other FISH related techniques, such as flow-FISH. In flow-FISH, flow cytometry is utilized to measure fluorescence intensity (and thus telomere length) in a large population of cells rather than just a handful of cells in Q-FISH. Conversely, unlike Q-FISH, flow-FISH is unable to determine telomere length in a particular chromosome within an individual cell. However, although Q-FISH is generally considered low-throughput and not suitable for population studies, groups have developed high-throughput (HT) Q-FISH protocols that use automated machinery to perform Q-FISH on interphase nuclei in 96well plates.

Similarly, other methods like multiplex-FISH and cenM-FISH have been developed which can also be used in conjunction with Q-FISH. Multiplex-FISH uses a variety of probes to visualize the 24 chromosomes in different colours and identify intra- or inter-chromosomal rearrangements. Centromere-specific multi-colour FISH (cenM-FISH) uses the multi-coloured probes from multiplex-FISH as well as centromere specific labeled probes to identify and distinguish centromere regions. The relation between centromere abnormalities or chromosomal rearrangements and telomere length may have high clinical impact, since all appear important in pre- or post-natal diagnostics and tumor developments. These experiments can provide more enlightenment about the role of telomeres and the importance of telomere length.
Another application of Q-FISH is the detection of telomeric fusions, where the ends of chromosomes have been fused together at the telomere, which are sometimes called interstitial (within the chromosome) telomeric sequences (ITSs). Studying telomeric fusions can sometimes show the course of evolution. For example, one human chromosome has an ITS that is hypothesized to be the equivalent of two chromosomes in chimpanzees that fused together. Observing the regulation of telomere length in different species also reveals important information about karyotype evolution and relevance to human illnesses.

In another example, the non-homologous end joining (NHEJ) protein repairs double-stranded DNA breaks and relies on the Ku70/Ku80 heterodimer to function. Disrupting these proteins causes telomeric shortening, which can be observed by measuring telomere length with FISH. For example, in mice lacking the Ku 80 gene, the telomere lengths are measured by qFISH and are observed to be significantly shorter.

Q-FISH is commonly used in cancer research to measure differences in telomere lengths between cancerous and non-cancerous cells. Telomere shortening causes genomic instability and occurs naturally with advanced age, both factors that correlate with possible causes of cancer.

== Advantages of Q-FISH ==
The greatest advantage of Q-FISH over other FISH techniques is the quantitative ability of the technique. Compared to traditional FISH which uses DNA probes, quantitative information is difficult to acquire because the hybridization probes compete with the renaturation of complementary genomic DNA strands. Therefore, by using PNAs and hybridizing them under very stringent conditions, it allows one to overcome this issue. Similarly, because one is able to denature the chromosomal DNA in the presence of the PNA probe, it simplifies the FISH procedure. In addition, the method provides greater resolution, allowing the user to examine the telomere length of each individual chromosome (p or q arm) in a particular cell. Also, unlike Southern blots which need over 10^{5} cells for a blot, less than 30 cells are needed in Q-FISH.

== Drawbacks of Q-FISH ==
Despite its advantages, Q-FISH is quite labor-intensive and is generally not suitable for high throughput analysis. The technique depends on well-prepared metaphase cells and it is vital that the equipment and samples are adjusted/normalized correctly in order for the quantification to be accurate. Also, while only a small quantity of cells are needed, it is difficult to get a sufficient number in metaphase at once. In addition, poor chromosome morphology may result from overexposure to high temperatures during preparation. Similarly, if one is using different cell types, many of the steps in Q-FISH (such as the length of colcemid treatment) will require optimization.

A common problem in fluorescence microscopy is photobleaching, where the fluorophore loses its activity as a result of exposure to light. This can lead to the inaccurate measurement of fluorescence intensity. Photobleaching, light source stability, and system variability are all sources of error but can be minimized if the user is able to reduce the acquisition time between samples and include the proper controls.

== Classical technique ==
Prior to the development of Q-FISH and PNAs, the classical technique for measuring telomere length was the use of Southern blots. In this method, genomic DNA is digested using restriction enzymes and separated by gel electrophoresis. The DNA is then transferred onto a membrane and hybridized using radioactive or fluorescent telomeric DNA probes. However, this method is only able to evaluate average telomere length in a cell population and the presence of interstitial telomeric sequences in the genome can yield inaccurate measurements.

== Variations of Q-FISH ==
=== Flow-FISH ===
Similar to Q-FISH, Flow-FISH is an adaptation of Q-FISH that combines the use of PNAs with flow cytometry. In this method, Flow-FISH uses interphase cells rather than metaphase chromosomes and hybridizes the PNA probes in suspension. Following hybridization, thousands of cells can be analyzed on a flow cytometer in a relatively short time. However, Flow-FISH only provides an average telomeric length for each cell whereas Q-FISH is able to analyze the telomere length of an individual chromosome.

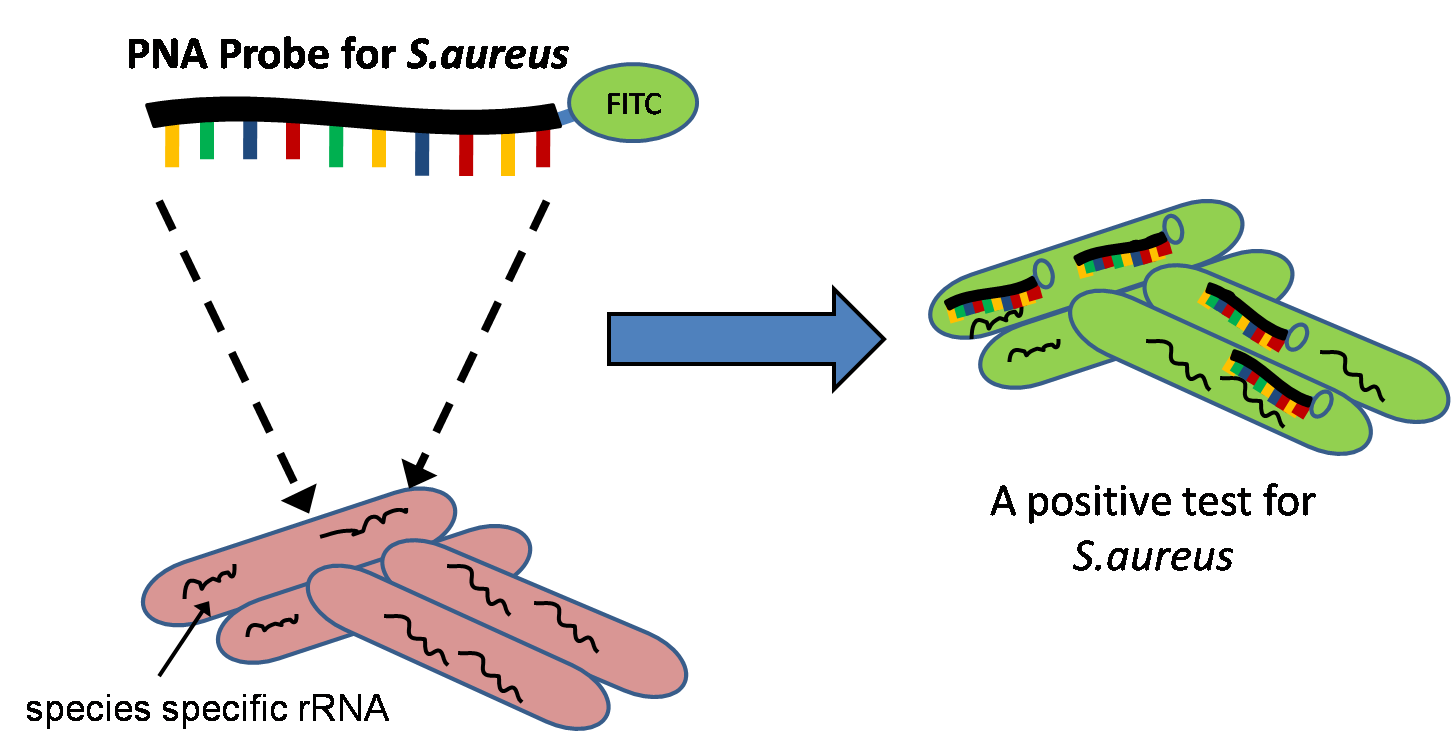
PNA-FISH can be used to screen blood cultures for various strains of bacteria

=== PNA-FISH ===
Although the quantitative ability of Q-FISH is most commonly used in telomere research, other fields that only require qualitative data have adopted the use of PNAs with FISH for both research and diagnostic purposes. PNA-FISH assays have been developed for identifying and diagnosing infectious diseases in a rapid manner within the clinic. Combined with traditional gram staining of positive blood cultures, PNAs can be used to target species-specific rRNA (ribosomal RNA) to identify different strains of bacteria or yeast. Since the test can be performed relatively quickly, the test is being considered for use in hospitals where hospital-acquired infections can occur.

=== CO-FISH (chromosome orientation-FISH) ===
Another adaptation that utilizes PNAs and FISH is known as CO-FISH (Chromosome Orientation-FISH) which allows for the labelling of chromosomes with PNAs in a strand specific manner. This method involves the selective removal of newly replicated strands of DNA (through the use of BrdU incorporation), resulting in only single stranded target DNA. By using different colored unidirectional PNA probes, it becomes possible to uniquely label sister chromatids.
