= Breakage-fusion-bridge cycle =

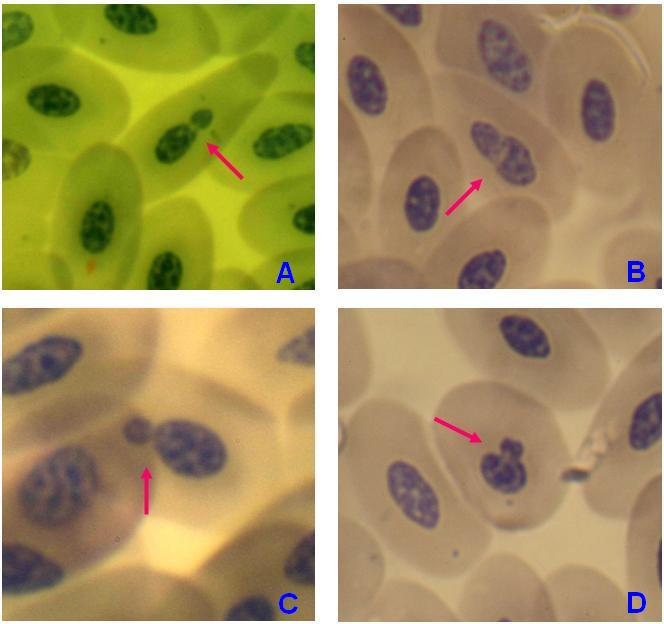
Cytological markers of BFB-cycle-mediated chromosomal instability: "budding" nuclei (A, C, D) and partly fragmented nucleus with double nucleoplasmic bridge (B).

Breakage-fusion-bridge (BFB) cycle (also breakage-rejoining-bridge cycle) is a mechanism of chromosomal instability, discovered by Barbara McClintock in the late 1930s.

== Mechanism ==
The BFB cycle begins when the end region of a chromosome, called its telomere, breaks off. When that chromosome subsequently replicates it forms two sister chromatids which both lack a telomere. Since telomeres appear at the end of chromatids, and function to prevent their ends from fusing with other chromatids, the lack of a telomere on these two sister chromatids causes them to fuse with one another. During anaphase the sister chromatids will form a bridge where the centromere in one of the sister chromatids will be pulled in one direction of the dividing cell, while the centromere of the other will be pulled in the opposite direction. Being pulled in opposite directions will cause the two sister chromatids to break apart from each other, but not necessarily at the site that they fused. This results in the two daughter cells receiving an uneven chromatid. Since the two resulting chromatids lack telomeres, when they replicate the BFB cycle will repeat, and will continue every subsequent cell division until those chromatids receive a telomere, usually from a different chromatid through the process of translocation.

== Implications in tumors ==
The presence of chromosomal aberrations has been demonstrated in every type of malignant tumor. Although BFB cycles are a major source of genome instability, the rearrangement signature predicted by this model is not commonly present in cancer genomes without other chromosome alterations like chromothripsis. BFB cycles and chromothripsis might be mechanistically related. The chromosome bridge formation could trigger a mutational cascade through the accumulation of chromothripsis in each cell division. This mechanism could explain the evolution and subclonal heterogeneity of some human cancers.

== Detection ==
Breakage-fusion-bridge creates several identifiable cytogenetic abnormalities, such as anaphase bridges and dicentric chromosomes, which can be seen in progress using methods that have been available for decades. More recent methods, such as microarray hybridization and sequencing technologies, allow to infer evidence of BFB after the process has ceased. Two main types of such evidence are fold-back inversions and segment copy number patterns. Fold-back inversions are chimeric sequences that span head-to-head arrangements of inverted tandem-duplicated segments, and are expected to appear in BFB modified genomes. In addition, BFB induces amplification of segments of the original genome, where the number of repeats of each segment in the rearranged genome can be experimentally measured. Whilst the number of possible copy number patterns (each pattern a segmentation of the original genome and corresponding segment counts) is large, testing whether a given copy number pattern was produced by BFB can be efficiently decided computationally. While other genome instability mechanisms may also induce fold-back inversions and relatively short BFB-like copy number patterns, it is unlikely that such mechanisms will induce sufficiently long copy number patterns coupled with significant presence of fold-back inversions, and therefore when such evidence are observed they are considered to be indicative of BFB.

== See also ==
- Chromosome instability syndrome
