= Multiple displacement amplification =

Multiple displacement amplification (MDA) is a DNA amplification technique. This method can rapidly amplify minute amounts of DNA samples to a reasonable quantity for genomic analysis. The reaction starts by annealing random hexamer primers to the template: DNA synthesis is carried out by a high fidelity enzyme, preferentially Φ29 DNA polymerase. Compared with conventional PCR amplification techniques, MDA does not employ sequence-specific primers but amplifies all DNA, generates larger-sized products with a lower error frequency, and works at a constant temperature. MDA has been actively used in whole genome amplification (WGA) and is a promising method for application to single cell genome sequencing and sequencing-based genetic studies.

== Background ==
Many biological and forensic cases involving genetic analysis require sequencing of DNA from minute amounts of sample, such as DNA from uncultured single cells or trace amounts of tissue collected from crime scenes. Conventional Polymerase Chain Reaction (PCR)-based DNA amplification methods require sequence-specific oligonucleotide primers and heat-stable (usually Taq) polymerase, and can be used to generate significant amounts of DNA from minute amounts of DNA. However, this is not sufficient for modern techniques which use sequencing-based DNA analysis. Therefore, a more efficient non-sequence-specific method to amplify minute amounts of DNA is necessary, especially in single-cell genomic studies.

== Materials ==
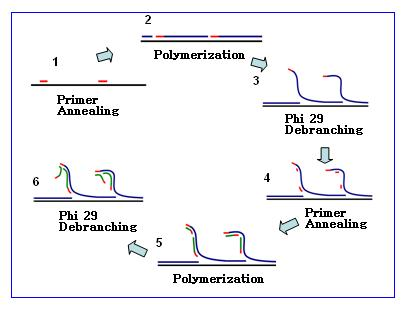
MDA reaction steps

=== Phi 29 DNA polymerase ===
Bacteriophage Φ29 DNA polymerase is a high-processivity enzyme that can produce DNA amplicons greater than 70 kilobase pairs. Its high fidelity and 3'–5' proofreading activity reduces the amplification error rate to 1 in 10^{6}−10^{7} bases compared to conventional Taq polymerase with a reported error rate of 1 in 9,000. The reaction can be carried out at a moderate isothermal condition of 30 °C and therefore does not require a thermocycler. It has been actively used in cell-free cloning, which is the enzymatic method of amplifying DNA in vitro without cell culturing and DNA extraction. The large fragment of Bst DNA polymerase is also used in MDA, but Ф29 is generally preferred due to its sufficient product yield and proofreading activity.

=== Hexamer primers ===
Hexamer primers are sequences composed of six random nucleotides. For MDA applications, these primers are usually thiophosphate-modified at their 3' end to convey resistance to the 3'–5' exonuclease activity of Ф29 DNA polymerase. MDA reactions start with the annealing of such primers to the DNA template followed by polymerase-mediated chain elongation. Increasing numbers of primer annealing events happen along the amplification reaction.

=== Reaction ===
The amplification reaction initiates when multiple primer hexamers anneal to the template. When DNA synthesis proceeds to the next starting site, the polymerase displaces the newly produced DNA strand and continues its strand elongation. The strand displacement generates a newly synthesized single-stranded DNA template for more primers to anneal. Further primer annealing and strand displacement on the newly synthesized template results in a hyper-branched DNA network. The sequence debranching during amplification results in a high yield of the products. To separate the DNA branching network, S1 nucleases are used to cleave the fragments at displacement sites. The nicks on the resulting DNA fragments are repaired by DNA polymerase I.

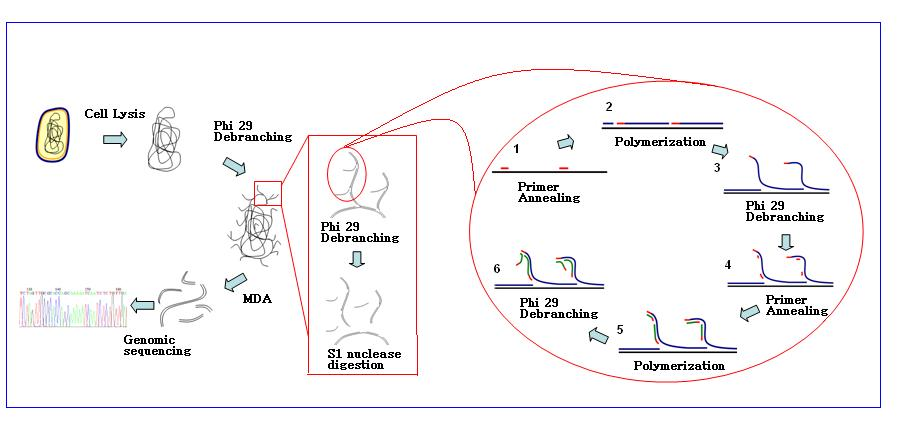
Single Cell Genome Sequencing （MDA）.JPG.

=== Product quality ===
MDA can generate 1–2 μg of DNA from single cell with genome coverage of up to 99%. Products also have lower error rate and larger sizes compared to PCR based Taq amplification.

General work flow of MDA:

1. Sample preparation: Samples are collected and diluted in the appropriate reaction buffer (Ca^{2+} and Mg^{2+} free). Cells are lysed with alkaline buffer.
2. Condition: The MDA reaction with Ф29 polymerase is carried out at 30 °C. The reaction usually takes about 2.5–3 hours.
3. End of reaction: Inactivate enzymes at 65 °C before collection of the amplified DNA products
4. DNA products can be purified with commercial purification kit.

== Advantages ==
MDA generates sufficient yield of DNA products. It is a powerful tool of amplifying DNA molecules from samples, such as uncultured microorganism or single cells to the amount that would be sufficient for sequencing studies. The large size of MDA-amplified DNA products also provides desirable sample quality for identifying the size of polymorphic repeat alleles. Its high fidelity also makes it reliable to be used in the single-nucleotide polymorphism (SNP) allele detection. Due to its strand displacement during amplification, the amplified DNA has sufficient coverage of the source DNA molecules, which provides a high-quality product for genomic analysis. The products of displaced strands can be subsequently cloned into vectors to construct library for subsequent sequencing reactions.

== Limitations ==
=== Allelic dropout (ADO) ===
ADO is defined as the random non-amplification of one of the alleles present in a heterozygous sample. Some studies have reported the ADO rate of the MDA products to be 0–60%. This drawback decreases the accuracy of genotyping of single sample and misdiagnosis in other MDA involved applications. ADO appears to be independent of the fragment sizes and has been reported to have a similar rate in other single-cell techniques. Possible solutions are the use of different lysis conditions or to carry out multiple rounds of amplifications from the diluted MDA products since PCR mediated amplification from cultured cells has been reported to give lower ADO rates.

=== Preferential amplification ===
'Preferential amplification' is over-amplification of one of the alleles in comparison to the other. Most studies on MDA have reported this issue. The amplification bias is currently observed to be random. It might affect the analysis of small stretches of genomic DNA in identifying Short Tandem Repeats (STR) alleles.

=== Primer-primer interactions ===
Endogenous template-independent primer-primer interaction is due to the random design of hexamer primers. One possible solution is to design constrained-randomized hexanucleotide primers that do not cross-hybridize.

== Applications ==
=== Single cell genome sequencing ===
Single cells of uncultured bacteria, archaea and protists, as well as individual viral particles and single fungal spores have been sequenced with the help of MDA.

The ability to sequence individual cells is also useful in combating human disease. Genomes from single human embryonic cells have been successfully amplified for sequencing using MDA, allowing preimplantation genetic diagnosis (PGD): screening for genetic health issues in an early-stage embryo before implantation. Diseases with heterogeneous properties, such as cancer, also benefit from MDA-based genome sequencing's ability to study mutations in individual cells.

The MDA products from a single cell have also been successfully used in array-comparative genomic hybridization experiments, which usually require a relatively large amount of amplified DNA.

=== Chromatin immunoprecipitation ===
Chromatin Immunoprecipitation results in production of complex mixtures of relatively short DNA fragments, which is challenging to amplify with MDA without causing a bias in the fragment representation. A method to circumvent this problem was proposed, which is based on conversion of these mixtures to circular concatemers using ligation, followed by Φ29 DNA polymerase-mediated MDA.

=== Forensic analysis ===
The trace amount of samples collected from crime scenes can be amplified by MDA to the quantity that is enough for forensic DNA analysis, which is commonly used in identifying victims and suspects.

== See also ==
- Polymerase chain reaction
- Whole genome amplification
