= Rinn (disambiguation) =

Rinn is a municipality in Austria.

Rinn or rINN may also refer to:

- Rinn (surname), a list of people
- Rinn Lough, a lake in Ireland
- Recommended international nonproprietary name (rINN), an official generic and nonproprietary name given to a pharmaceutical drug or active ingredient

== See also ==
- Rin (disambiguation)
- RIN (disambiguation)
- Rinne (disambiguation)
