= Rin =

Rin may refer to:

- 1 rin coin (厘), 1/1000 yen, former Japanese currency
- Rin (given name)
- Rin (detergent), a brand of detergent sold by Unilever
- Rin, a Japanese standing bell
- Mnemosyne (anime) or RIN: Daughters of Mnemosyne, an anime
- Rin! (凛!), a Japanese manga comic
- Rin', a Japanese pop group active from 2003 to 2009
- rin(), one representation of the functional square root of sin()
- Rin (album) (凛, "Dignified") 2017
- Rin, an English language name for the 1986 Japanese television series Hanekonma
- Kagamine Rin (鏡音 リン), a fictional character presented by Crypton Future Media, Inc. as part of its singing voice synthesis product offerings

== See also ==
- RIN (disambiguation)
- Rinn (disambiguation)
- Rinne (disambiguation)
