= Teg147 =

TEG147
- Consensus secondary structure and sequence conservation of Staphylococcus aureus small RNA TEG147

Identifiers
- Symbol: TEG147
- Rfam: RF03535

Other data
- RNA type: Cis-reg
- GO: GO:0003729
- SO: SO:0001055
- PDB structures: PDBe

Teg147 RNA (also known as sRNA85, SAOUHSCs103) is a non-coding RNA identified by RNA-seq in Staphylococcus aureus N315 with homologues in other Staphylococcus species.
