= Cloone River =

River in County Leitrim, Ireland

- Native name: Abhainn na Cluana (Irish)

Location
- County: County Leitrim
- Province: Connacht
- Country: Ireland

Physical characteristics
- Mouth
  - location: Lough Rinn
  - coordinates: 53.89°N 7.846°W

Cloone River (Irish: Abhainn na Cluana) is a river in County Leitrim in Ireland, in the province of Connaught, in the central part of the country. Its course is almost entirely within the boundaries of the Civil parish of Cloone. The river runs from the tripoint of the townlands Aghalough, Sunnaghconner, and Corraneary in an overall south-southwesterly direction before it passes through Lough Errew and from there into Lough Rinn.
