= RIN =

RIN may refer to:

- RIN (rapper), Renato Šimunović (born 1994), German-Croatian rapper
- Rassemblement pour l'Indépendance Nationale, a former Quebec nationalist group
- Regulation Identifier Number, a unique 8-digit alphanumeric code assigned to regulations under development in the United States.
- Relative Intensity Noise, a noise term in fiber-optic communication
- Renewable Identification Number, a serial number assigned to a batch of biofuel for the purpose of tracking
- RNA integrity number, a method of assessing RNA quality for biochemical applications
- Royal Indian Navy, the naval force of British India
- Royal Institute of Navigation, a learned society for Navigation.

== See also ==
- Rin (disambiguation)
