= Lough Rynn Castle =

Castle in County Leitrim, Ireland

Coordinates: 53°53′35″N 7°50′49″W

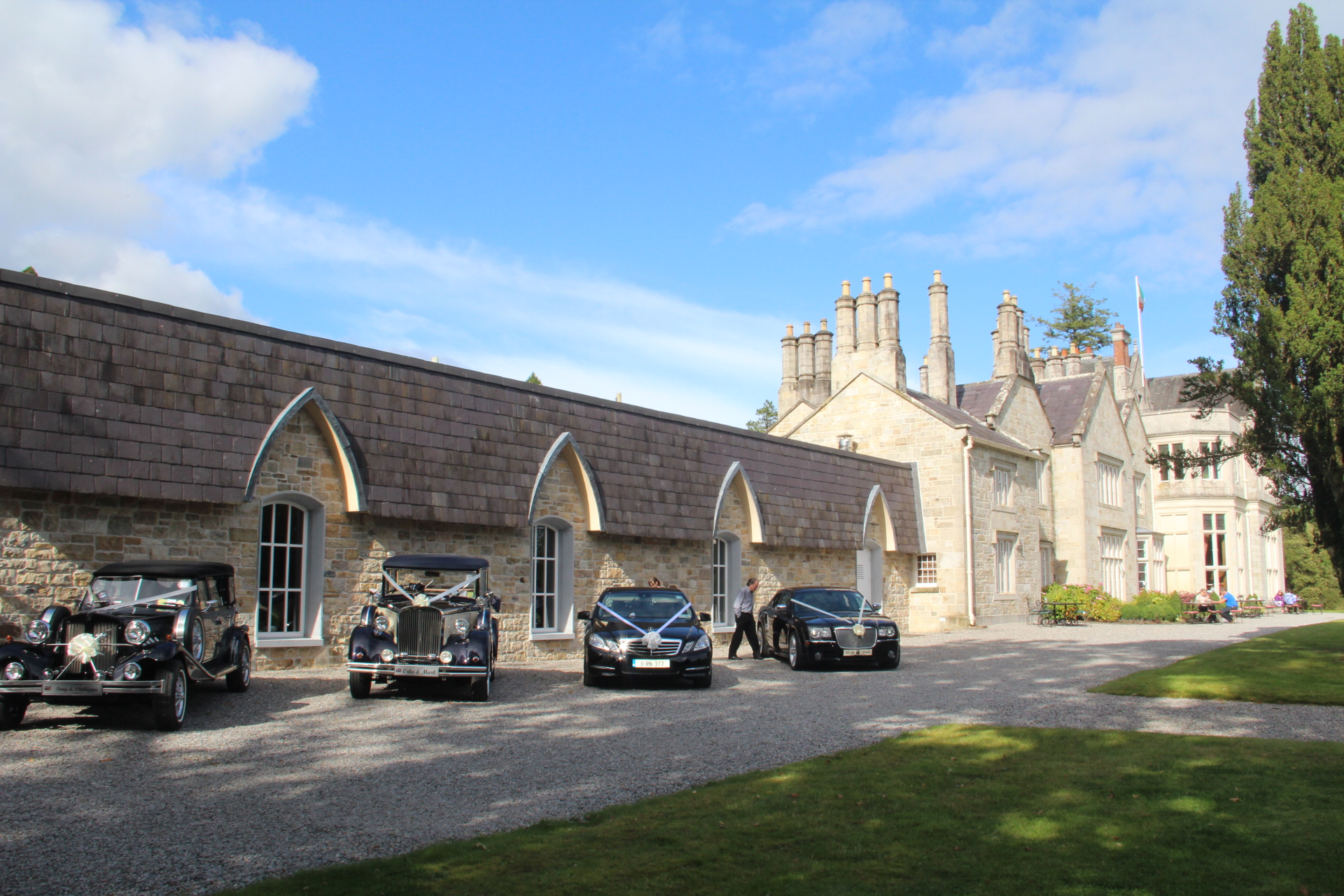
- View of Lough Rynn Castle from wedding courtyard/walled garden side
- Interactive map of the Lough Rynn Castle area

General information
- Location: County Leitrim, Ireland

Lough Rynn Castle (Irish: Caisleán Loch na Reanna) is a luxury castle hotel on the shores of Lough Rynn in Gortletteragh County Leitrim, Ireland situated on the historic grounds of the medieval castle and estate of the Mac Raghnaill family of Muintir Eolais.

== Location ==
Lough Rynn Castle and estate is located on an isthmus between the lakes of Lough Rynn and Lough Erril. It is some 4 km from Mohill, 145 km from Dublin City on the N4 and 155 km from Galway City. The nearest airport is Ireland West Airport, 99 km away.

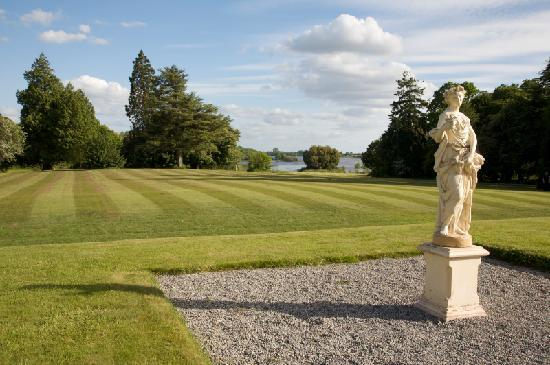
View towards Lough Rynn

== History ==
=== Mac Raghnaill family ( –1621) ===
The current Lough Rynn estate is built on the ancestral lands of Clan Maelsechlainn-Oge Mac Raghnaill, the pre-Conquest rulers of this part of County Leitrim known as Muintir Eolais. The Annals of Loch Cé and Annals of Connacht refer to "the crannóg of Claenloch" (Lough Rynn) in the High Middle Ages (1247 AD), with the structure marked on some maps as "Crannoge" or "Crane Island", while the medieval Mac Raghnaill's Castle is mentioned in 1474 AD.

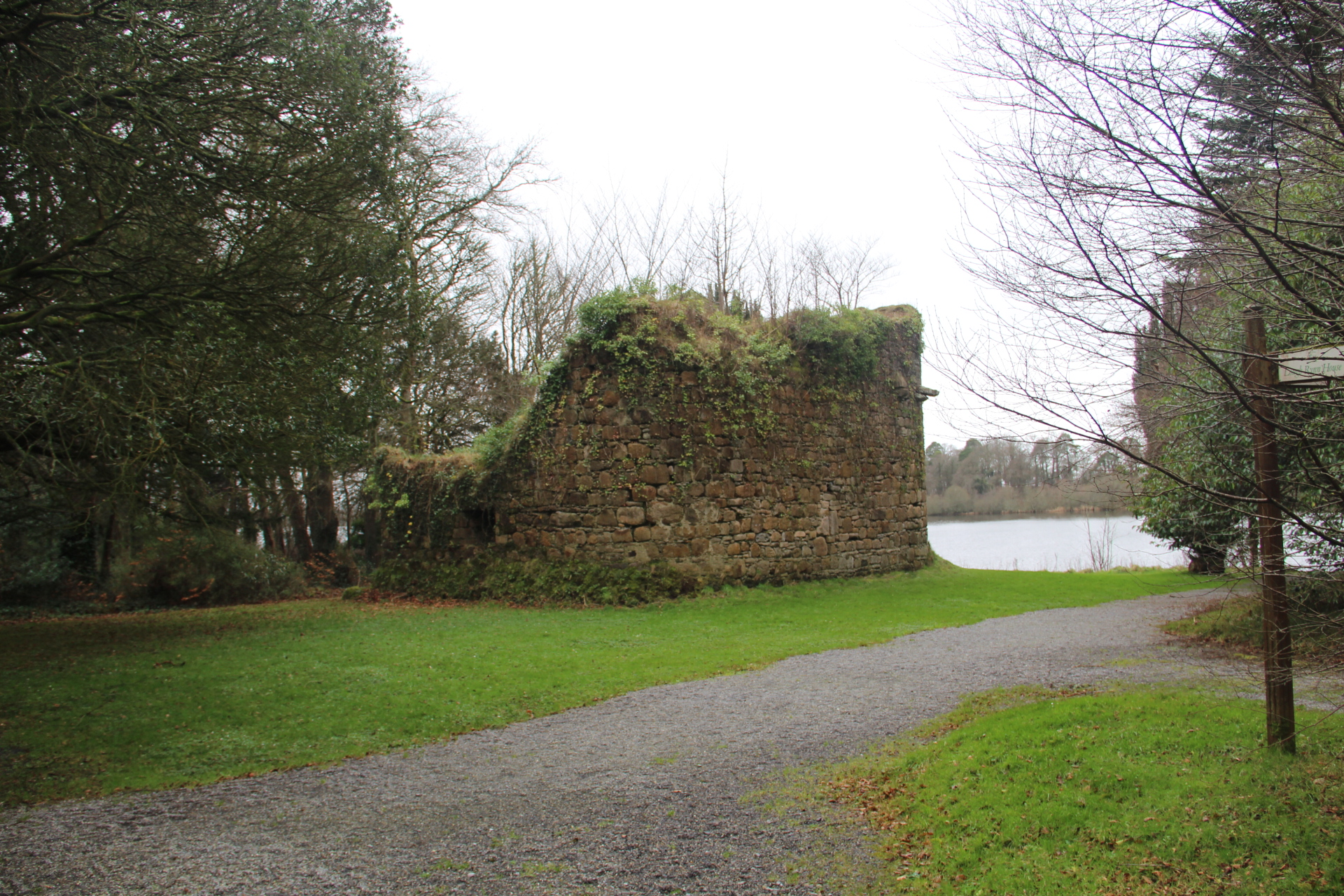
The remains of Mac Raghnaill Castle

The ruins of Mac Raghnaill's Castle are located close to the lake and some 500 metres from the existing Lough Rynn Castle. Historian Fiona Slevin describes the structure of the castle as "fairly standard for the time, but it did have a few unusual - and clever - features. Although a square shape, the castle had rounded corners that made it more impervious to artillery attacks and it had a straight stairway carved into the hollow of a wall, rather than the more usual spiral stair in one corner."

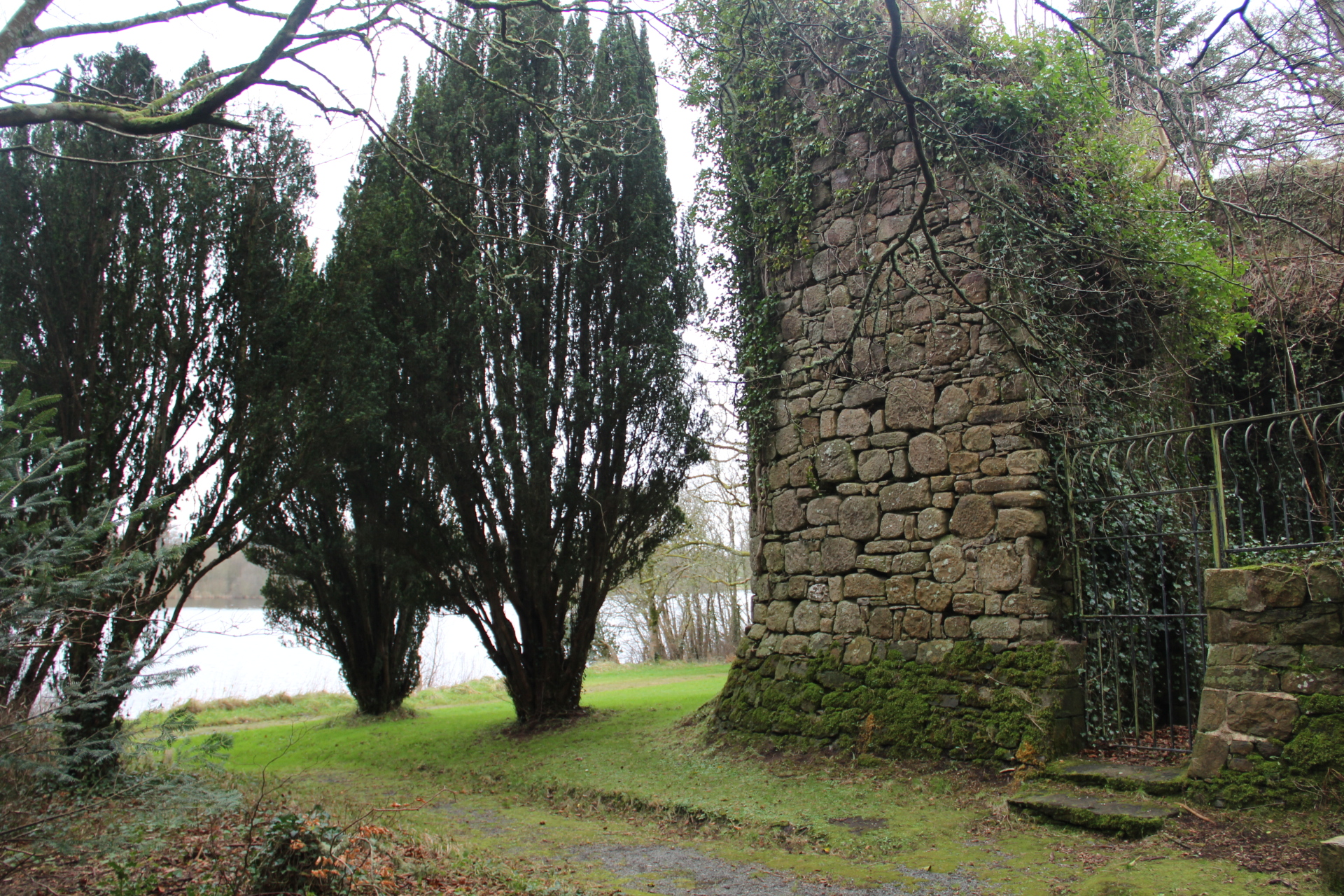
The remains of Mac Raghnaill Castle

The Mac Raghnaill family played an important role in the Nine Years War as allies of Aodh Mór Ó Néill in resisting the English conquest of Ireland.

=== Crofton family (1621–1750) ===
In the English Plantation of 1621, the Mac Raghnaill lands in Lough Rynn were confiscated and granted to an English family named Crofton. The Croftons brought British Protestant settlers with them and in the 1620s and 1630s the native Irish were gradually removed from the land.

=== Clements family (1750–1970s) ===
In 1750 the Croftons were replaced by another English family named Clements. Daniel Clements, an officer in Oliver Cromwell's army, had been granted land in County Cavan which had been confiscated from the Irish following the Cromwellian conquest of Ireland. In 1750, Nathaniel Clements acquired the Lough Rynn estate, while remaining on his lands in Cavan. Nevertheless, the Clements became involved in political life in Leitrim with Robert Clements becoming sheriff for the county in 1759. In 1795, Robert Clements became the first Earl of Leitrim. In 1833, Robert Bermingham, Viscount Clements (son of the second Earl), built a mock Tudor revival house overlooking Lough Rynn. It is this property which is the basis for the currentLough Rynn Castle.

=== William Sydney Clements, 3rd Earl of Leitrim ===
Upon Robert's death in 1839, management of Lough Rynn estate passed to his brother, William Sydney Clements. Their father, Nathaniel Clements, 2nd Earl of Leitrim, died in 1854, and William became the 3rd Earl. He inherited a massive estate of 90,000 acres which stretched across four counties. From around this time Sydney Clements asserted his control over the estate in an authoritarian manner which won him many opponents among the tenantry. The inability of tenants to pay rent during and after An Gorta Mór (the Famine) provided him with an opportunity to clear his estate and introduce more productive farming practices.

The change in attitude towards tenants by this new Lord Leitrim is seen four years after he assumed his father's title. In 1858, in a nationally reported event, Clements assembled one thousand armed military and police to repossess the local Gortletteragh Church for non-payment of rent, rent which his liberally-minded father had refused to take. However, some six thousand men turned up from Longford, Westmeath, Roscommon, and across Leitrim on the day to defend the church, forcing Clements to back down. The Nation noted at this time that Lord Leitrim was "already famous for such proceedings towards his tenantry as not many even of his own order dare imitate." By 1860 Sydney Clements had firmly abandoned the liberal cause which his brother and father had supported and had become a staunch supporter of the Conservatives. He became more reactionary against the many calls for land reform which dominated post-Famine Ireland. In 1870, he spoke out vehemently against William Gladstone's first Irish Land Act, believing it to be an encroachment on the rights of property owners.

During the 1860s, hatred towards Sydney Clements grew in the surrounding area and stories began to be told of his mistreatment of the wives and daughters of local men. In September 1860, James Murphy from Mohill fired a pistol at him, two days after sending him a note challenging him to a duel to 'take satisfaction for your ruffianly conduct towards my wife'. An additional attempt to shoot him followed in the 1860s. By the 1870s Lord Leitrim was arguably the most infamous landlord in Ireland, symbolising 'evil at its worst'. In Donegal in particular Sydney Clements was the object of deep resentment and had to travel under armed military escort. In 1878 Sydney Clements engaged in a wholesale eviction of his tenants there, many of whom were starving as a result of the famine which hit northwest Ireland in 1878/79. On 2 April 1878, three men, Michael Heraghty, Michael McElwee, and Neil Sheils, ambushed and killed Sydney Clements at Cratlagh Wood near Milford, County Donegal.

Leitrim's assassination received widespread publicity in Ireland and abroad, with proponents of land reform using it as evidence of the need to protect tenants from the abuses of tyrannical landlords. His funeral in Dublin was marked by further riots, while none of the three assassins were convicted of his death.

=== Extension and refurbishment of the castle (1889) ===
The inheritor of the Lough Rynn estate was Sydney Clements' English-educated cousin who lived in Cavan, Colonel Henry Theophilus Clements, rather than the heir presumptive to the title who lived in England. This Colonel Clements embarked on an extensive expansion and refurbishment of the castle. He added a new wing, built a Baronial Hall designed by Thomas Drew with heavy plaster cornices, a large ornate Inglenook fireplace, and a fretted ceiling and walls wainscoted in solid English oak. Upon its completion in 1889, the principal floor of the house contained a main hall, Baronial Hall, chapel, reception room, living, room and dining room. Two pantries, a kitchen, study, smokehouse, and store were accessed by a separate entrance. In the basement there were stores and a wine cellar. There were fourteen bedrooms and four bathrooms upstairs.

By 1952, when Marcus Clements took over the Lough Rynn estate, most of it had been sold off to former tenants under the land acts of the late nineteenth and early twentieth centuries. Clements lived there until the 1970s. The estate remained largely empty until 1990 when it was purchased by an Irish-American investor, Michael Flaherty. In 2001, Lough Rynn estate was purchased by the current owners, the Hanly family. They invested substantially in overhauling and modernising the house and estates. In September 2006, when Lough Rynn Castle finally opened as a hotel, the estate extended to three hundred acres.

== Hotel ==
=== Castle ===
Lough Rynn Castle Hotel now has forty-two bedrooms, a baronial hall, a library named after John McGahern, drawing room, piano room, bar, the award-winning Sandstone restaurant, as well as conference, bar and wedding facilities for up to three hundred guests in an adjoining function room. It is wheelchair accessible.

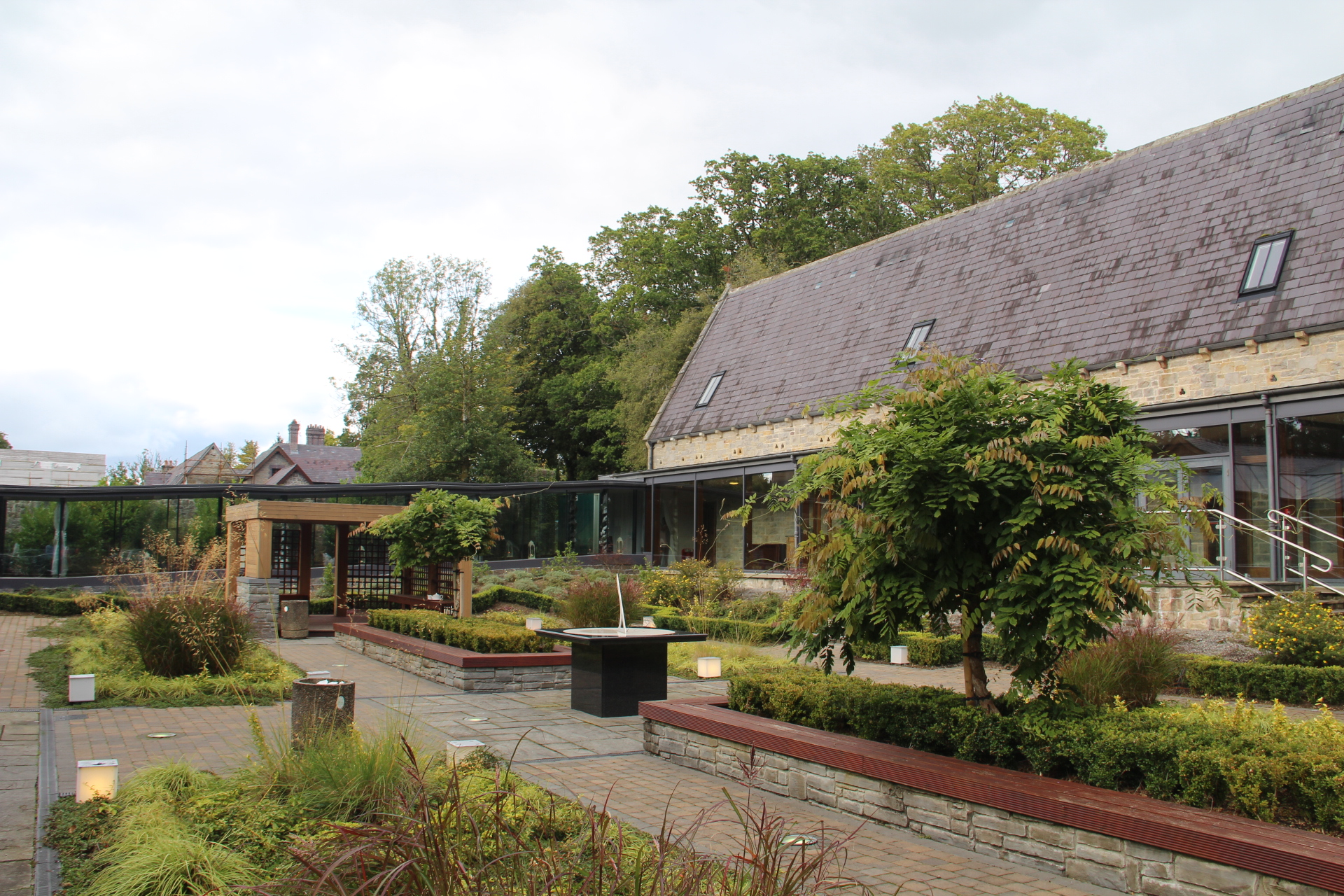
Cúirt na Bainise (Wedding Courtyard)

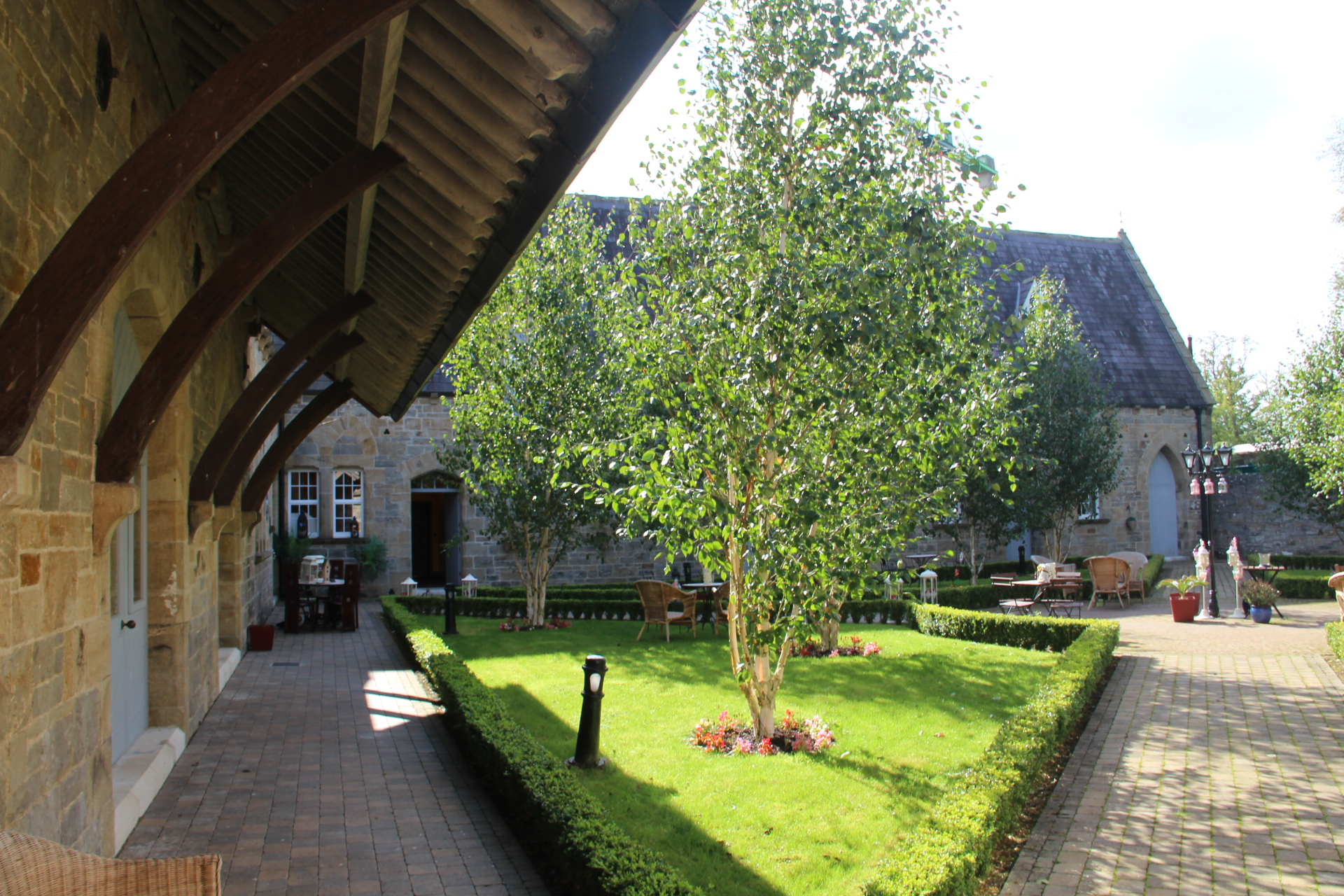
Front Courtyard

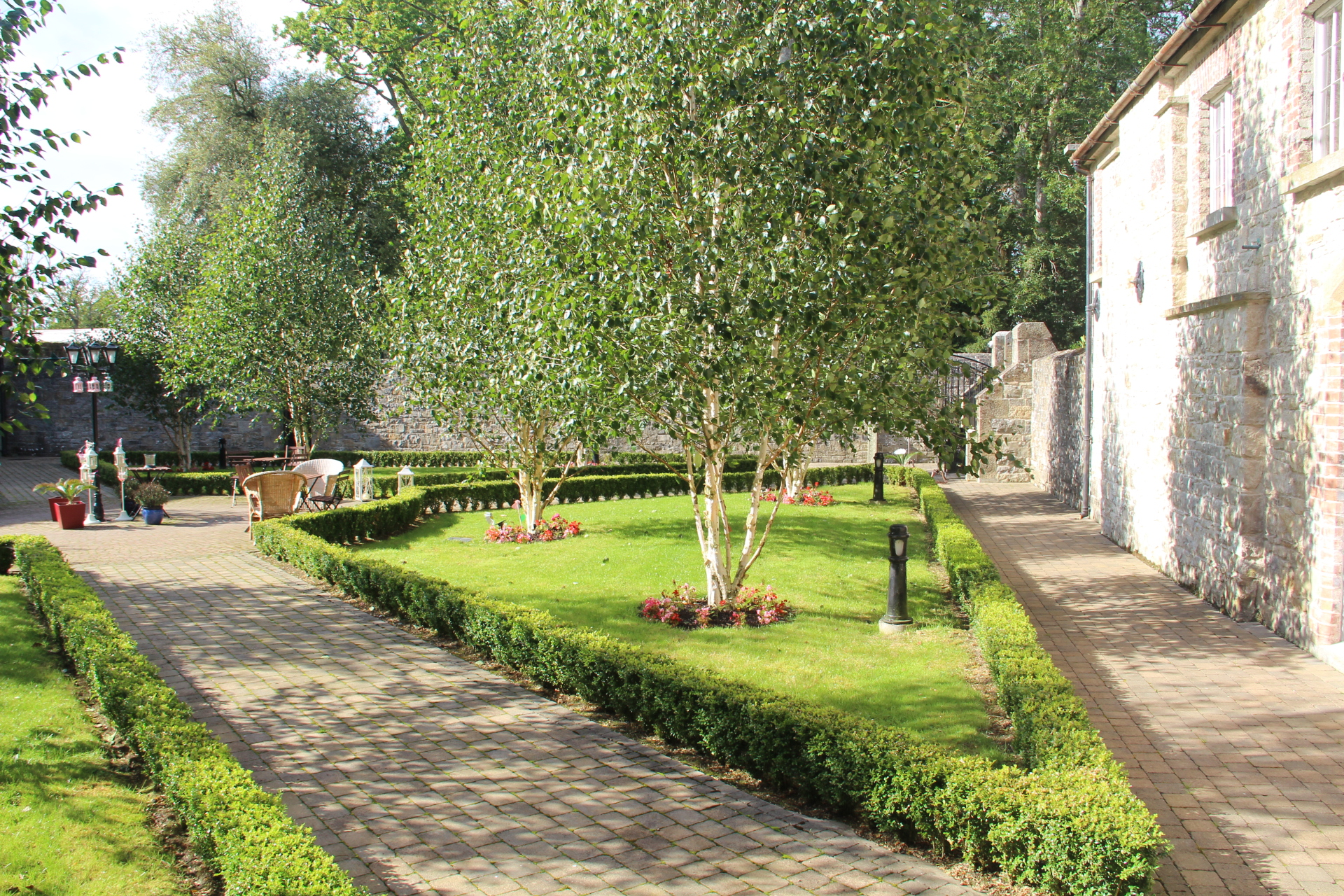
Front Courtyard

=== Gardens ===
A four-hundred-year-old oak tree still exists on the grounds of the estate, as does a Bronze Age tomb named Cloch an Draoi ('Druid's Altar') on The Druid's Hill between Lough Erril ("Lough Errew") and Lough Rynn, which can be dated between 1900BC and 300BC.

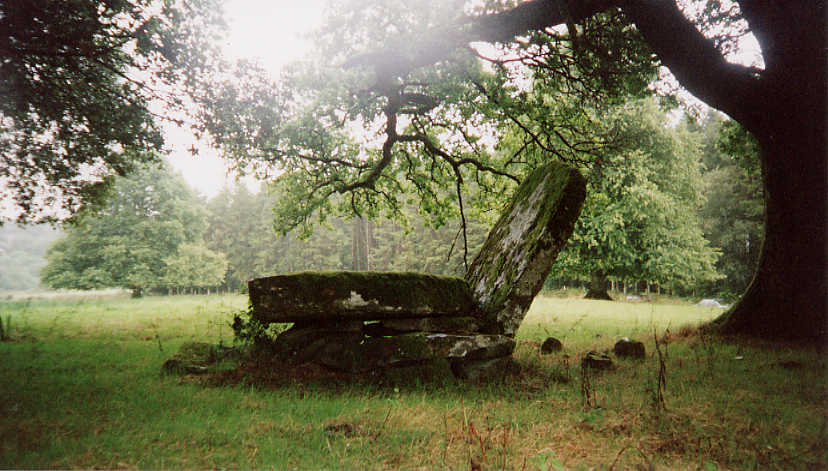
Cloch an Draoi (Druid's Altar)

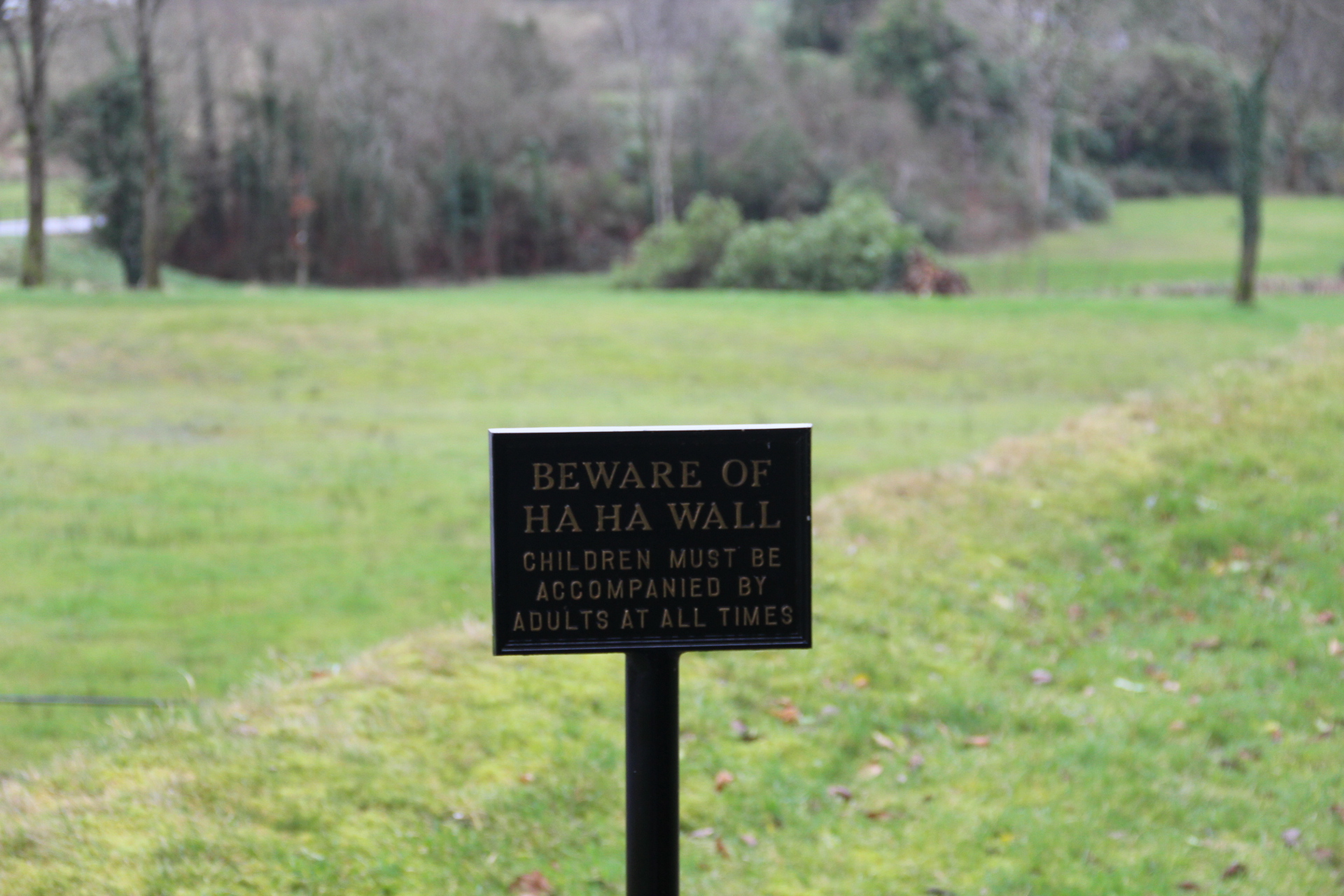
Ha-ha wall sign

There are also sawmills, a farmyard, arboretum, green house, French stable yards, nature trails, and terraced gardens. There are two bridges across the Rynn river which connects Lough Erril and Lough Rynn, the Red Bridge and the Blue Bridge. The principal walkway across the estate starts at the Castle, veers left by the 'Ha-ha wall and Blue Bridge on your left-hand side.

Turn right with the path and you pass the crannóg in Lough Rynn as you walk towards the Boathouse.

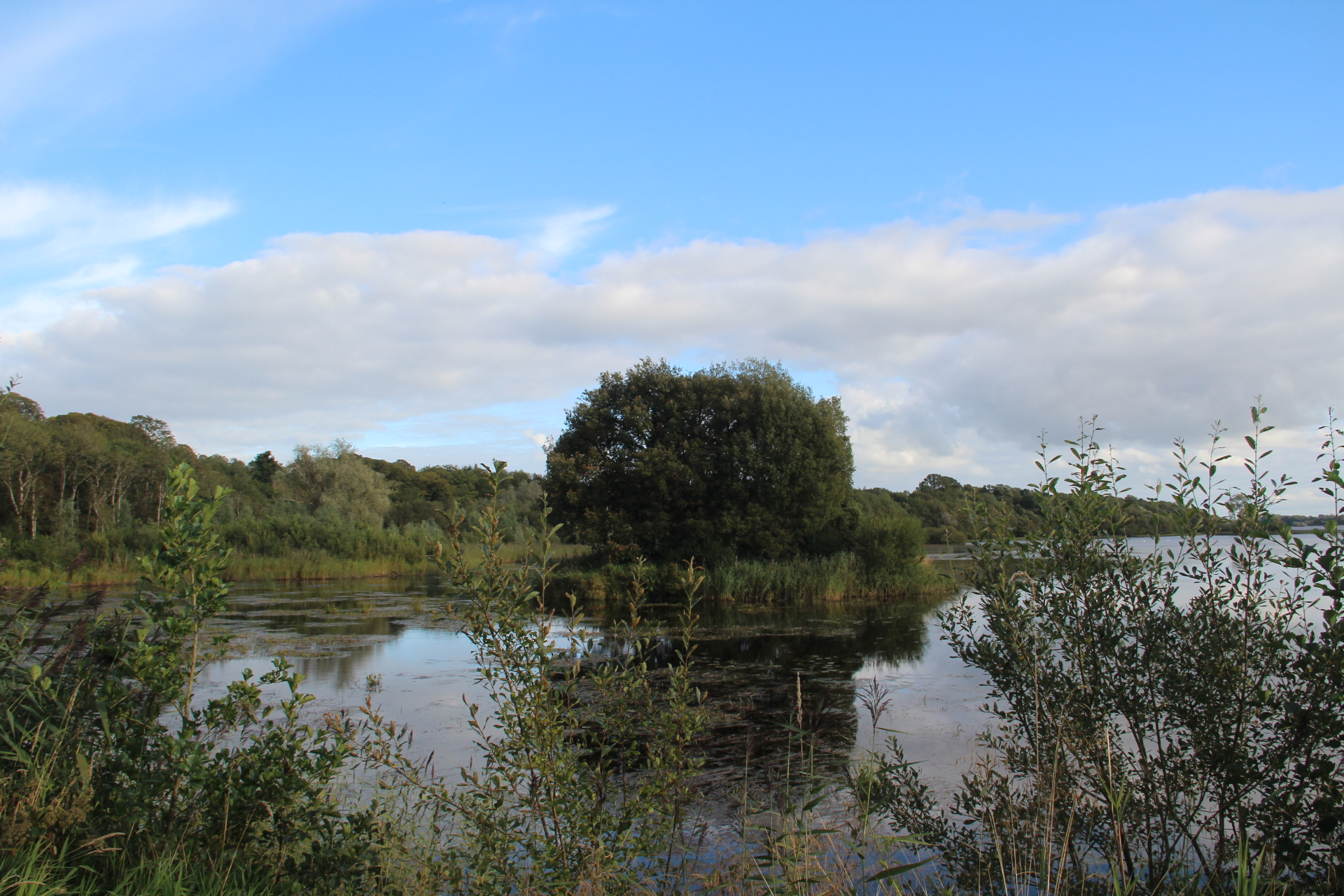
Site of the ancient Lough Rynn crannóg

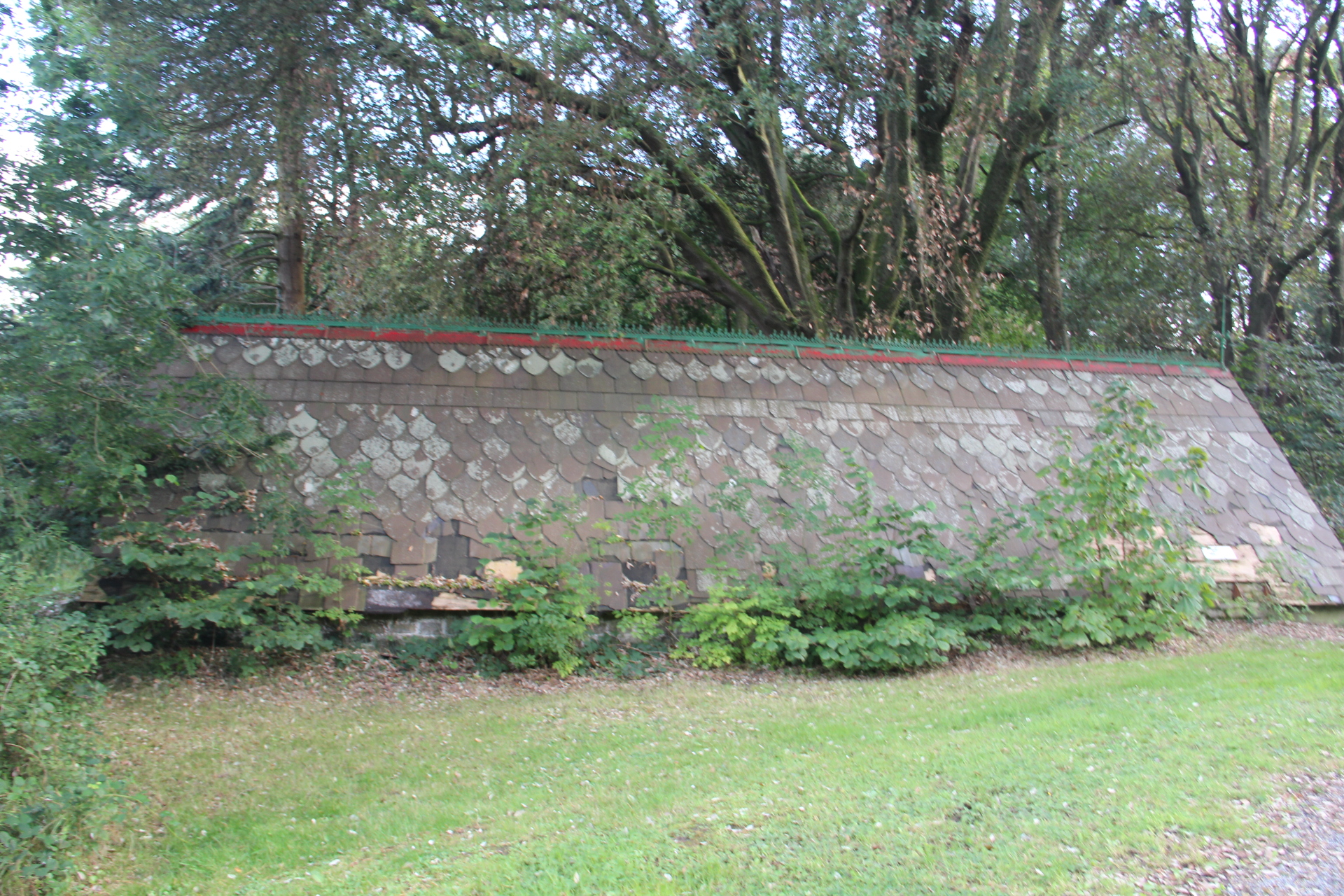
Lough Rynn Boathouse

Beyond the Boathouse is the remains of the Mac Raghnaill medieval castle at another shore of Lough Rynn. A left after the castle will bring you to the Rockery and Wishing Chair next to the lake. A right along the shore at this point will lead to the back entrance of the estate's centerpiece, the enormous three-tiered walled gardens which overlook the lake.

Originally constructed between 1855 and 1860, upon their reopening on 5 August 2008 Lough Rynn Castle's walled gardens were the largest privately owned walled gardens in Ireland.

== Planned golf facilities ==
A golf course and spa were planned on the site. Nick Faldo designed the golf course and construction for the course commenced in April 2004. Faldo attended the hotel's opening day on 10 September 2006. The idea for the spa was scrapped because the Hanly Group wanted to focus more on the golf course. It was expected to be finished by mid-2008, but a delay in the construction meant that it would not be complete until 2009. By that stage however, they had run out of money and only 60% of it was completed. There have been no talks about bringing it back since. Construction ended in 2010.

The surface area of the project was 1.1 km^{2}. It consisted of 18 holes and there was a club house behind trees beside the entrance. During time of construction, a new road was built to accommodate it and some of the old road was used to be part of the golf course. Today, the paths and golf course grounds are now closed to the public, but they are mostly covered with bushes and some paths have become bumpy. However, what would have been one of the entrances to the course has now become a fishing spot for anglers.
