= Rinn Lough =

Lake in south County Leitrim, Ireland

- Claonloch (Irish)
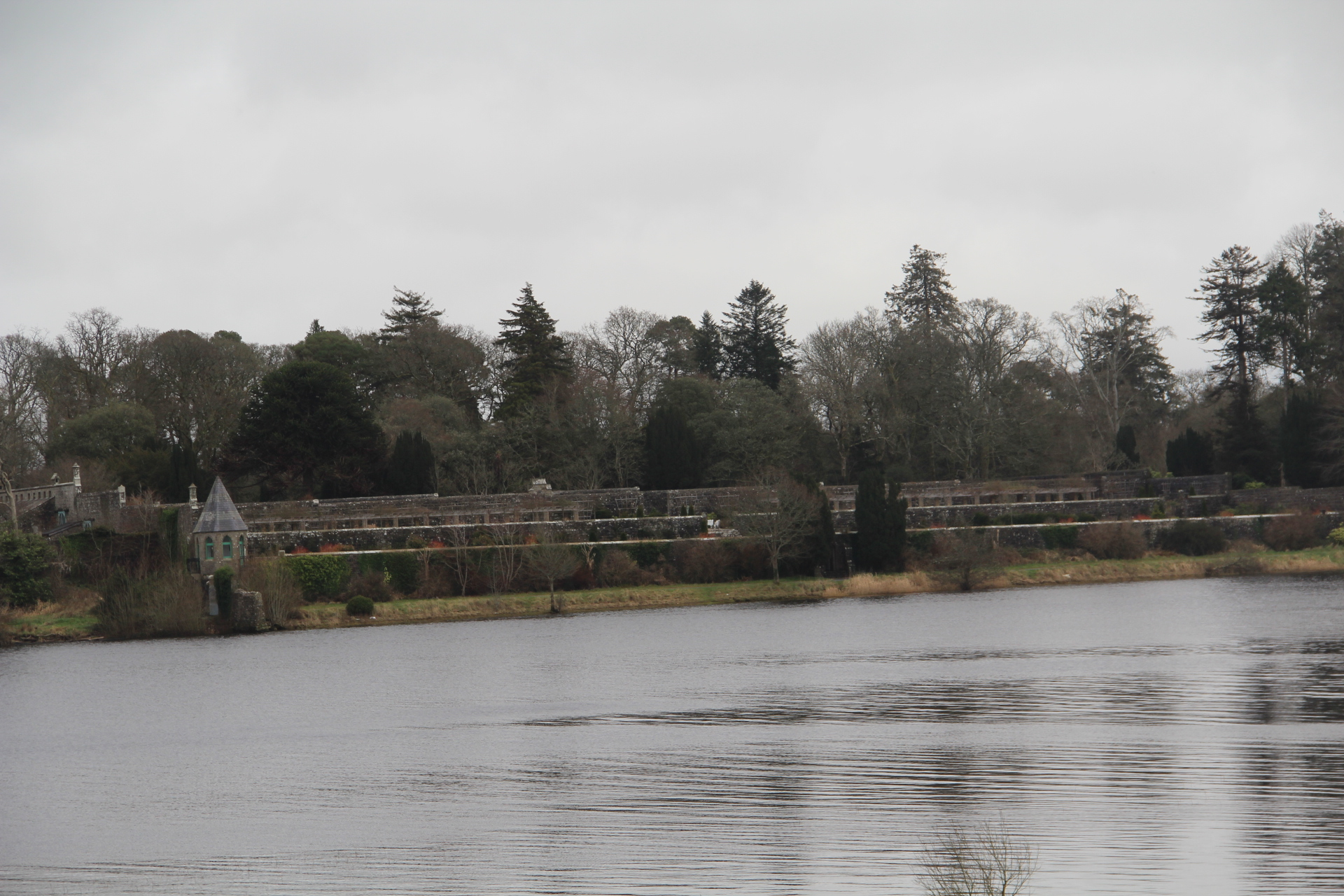
- Walled gardens of Lough Rynn Castle from far side of the lake

- Location in Ireland
- Location: County Leitrim
- Coordinates: 53°53′3″N 7°50′52″W
- Primary inflows: Cloone River
- Primary outflows: River Rinn
- Catchment area: 178.06 km^{2} (68.7 sq mi)
- Basin countries: Ireland
- Max. length: 4 km (2.5 mi)
- Max. width: 0.7 km (0.4 mi)
- Surface area: 1.65 km^{2} (0.64 sq mi)
- Surface elevation: 39 m (128 ft)
- Islands: 6
- Settlements: Mohill

Rinn Lough (Irish: Claonloch, also Irish: Loch na Reanna), also known as Lough Rynn, is a freshwater lake in the northwestern part of Ireland. It is located in south County Leitrim.

== Geography ==
Rinn Lough measures about 4 km (2.5 mi) long and 1 km (0.6 mi) wide. It is located about 4 km (2 mi) south of Mohill. Lough Rynn Castle, a medieval castle now a hotel, occupies an estate on the lake's northeastern shore.

== Hydrology ==
Two smaller neighbouring lakes drain into Rinn Lough: Clooncoc Lough and Lough Errew. Rinn Lough drains south into the Rinn River flowing into Lough Forbes. Part of the river forms the Rinn River Natural Heritage Area.

== Ecology ==
The water quality was reported to be satisfactory c. 2001 – c. 2006 maintaining a mesotrophic rating. (Note: Trophic states of "Oligotrophic" and "Mesotrophic" are desirable, but freshwater lakes rated 'Eutrophic' or 'Hypertrophic' indicates pollution.) but given a "bad ecological status" c. 2007 – c. 2009 due to pollution. Zebra mussel infestation is present. The ecology of Rinn Lough, and Irish waterways, remains threatened by curly waterweed, zebra mussel, and freshwater clam invasive species.

== See also ==
- List of loughs in Ireland

== References and notes ==
=== Secondary sources ===
- Clenaghan, Conor; Clinton, Frank; Crowe, Matthew (2005). Phosphorus Regulations National Implementation Report (PDF) (Report). Environmental Protection Agency, Office of Environmental Enforcement.
- Pedreschi, D.; Kelly-Quinn, M.; Caffrey, J; O'Grady, M.; Mariani, S.; Phillimore, A. (2014), "Genetic structure of pike (Esox lucius) reveals a complex and previously unrecognized colonization history of Ireland", Journal of Biogeography, 41 (3), Journal of Biogeography, 41(3), 548–560.: 548–560, doi:10.1111/jbi.12220, PMC 4238397, PMID 25435649
- EPA (2010). Martin McGarrigle; John Lucey; Micheál Ó Cinnéide (eds.). Water Quality in Ireland 2007-2009 (PDF) (Report). EPA, Aquatic Environment Office of Environmental Assessment.
