= RNA spike-in =

Three-dimensional structure of an RNA molecule. RNA spike-ins are short synthetic RNA polymers.

An RNA spike-in is an RNA transcript of known sequence and quantity used to calibrate measurements in RNA hybridization assays, such as DNA microarray experiments, RT-qPCR, and RNA-Seq.

A spike-in is designed to bind to a DNA molecule with a matching sequence, known as a control probe. This process of specific binding is called hybridization. A known quantity of RNA spike-in is mixed with the experiment sample during preparation. The degree of hybridization between the spike-ins and the control probes is used to normalize the hybridization measurements of the sample RNA.

== History ==
Nucleic acid hybridization assays have been used for decades to detect specific sequences of DNA or RNA, with a DNA microarray precursor used as early as 1965. In such assays, positive control oligonucleotides are necessary to provide a standard for comparison of target sequence concentration, and to check and correct for nonspecific binding; that is, incidental binding of the RNA to non-complementary DNA sequences. These controls became known as "spike-ins". With the advent of DNA microarray chips in the 1990s and the commercialization of high-throughput methods for sequencing and RNA detection assays, manufacturers of hybridization assay "kits" started to provide pre-developed spike-ins. In the case of gene expression assay microarrays or RNA sequencing (RNA-seq), RNA spike-ins are used.

== Manufacturing ==
RNA spike-ins can be synthesized by any means of creating RNA synthetically, or by using cells to transcribe DNA to RNA in vivo (in cells). RNA can be produced in vitro (cell free) using RNA polymerase and DNA with the desired sequence. Large scale biotech manufacturers produce RNA synthetically via high-throughput techniques and provide solutions of RNA spike-ins at predetermined concentration. Bacteria containing DNA (usually on plasmids) for transcription to spike-ins are also commercially available. The purified RNA can be stored long-term in a buffered solution at low temperature.

== Applications ==
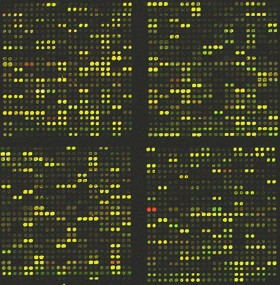
Example of DNA microarray data. The bright spots show locations where hybridization has occurred, indicating that RNA of the corresponding sequence was present in the sample.

=== DNA microarrays ===
DNA microarrays are solid surfaces, usually a small chip, to which short DNA polymers of known sequence are covalently bound. When a sample of unknown RNA is flowed over the array, the RNA base pairs with and binds to complementary DNA. Bound transcripts can be detected, indicating the presence of RNA with the corresponding sequence. DNA microarray assays are useful in studies of gene expression, because many of the mRNA transcripts present in a cell can be detected at the same time. RNA spike-ins of known quantity can provide a baseline signal for comparison with the signal from transcripts of unknown quantity, such that the data can be normalized within an array and between different arrays.

=== Sequencing ===
RNA sequencing (RNA-Seq) is performed by reverse transcribing RNA to complementary DNA (cDNA) and high-throughput sequencing the cDNA. Such high-throughput methods can be error prone, and known controls are necessary to detect and correct for levels of error. RNA spike-in controls can provide a measure of sensitivity and specificity of an RNA-Seq experiment.

== See also ==
- DNA spiking
- qPCR
