= Rinn (surname) =

Rinn is a surname. Notable people with the surname include:

- Charles Rinn (1849–1929), French hellenist and lexicographer
- Danuta Rinn, stage name of Polish singer and actress Danuta Rynduch-Czyżewska (1936–2006)
- Hans Rinn (born 1953), East German former luger
- Joseph F. Rinn (1868–1952), American magician and skeptic of paranormal phenomena
- Liam Ó Rinn (1886–1943), Irish civil servant and Irish-language writer and translator born William J. Ring
- Paul X. Rinn (1946–2022), United States Navy captain
