= Aleksi Rinne =

Finnish politician

Aleksi Rinne (6 June 1899 in Teuva – 25 September 1974) was a Finnish smallholder and politician. He was a member of the Parliament of Finland from 1945 to 1948, representing the Finnish People's Democratic League (SKDL).
