= Rinne =

Rinne may refer to:

== People ==
- Aleksi Rinne (1899–1974), Finnish smallholder and politician
- Antti Rinne (b. 1962), Finnish politician
- Esa Rinne (b. 1943), Finnish athlete
- Fanny Rinne (b. 1980), field hockey midfielder from Germany
- Fred Rinne (b. 1955), American visual and performance artist
- Friedrich Rinne (1863–1933), German mineralogist, crystallographer and petrographer
- Heinrich Adolf Rinne, German otologist
- Jacob Rinne (b. 1993), Danish footballer
- John Rinne (1923–2010), Orthodox Archbishop of Karelia and All Finland
- Joel Rinne (1897–1981), Finnish actor
- Jorma Rinne (1936–2003), Finnish discus thrower
- Jouni Rinne (b. 1956), retired Finnish ice hockey player
- Kris Rinne, technology person and retired Senior VP of network technology at AT&T Labs
- Paul Rinne (b. 1889–1946), Estonian chess player
- Pekka Rinne (b. 1982), Finnish ice hockey goaltender
- Rasmus Rinne (b. 1990), Finnish ice hockey goaltender
- Rinne Yoshida, Japanese idol singer
- Tapani Rinne (b. 1962), Finnish musician, composer and record producer
- Taru Rinne (b. 1968), former Finnish motorcycle racer
- Tommi Rinne (1925–1999), Finnish actor
- Vilho Rinne (1895–1980), Finnish athlete

== Media ==
- Rinne no Lagrange, or Lagrange: The Flower of Rin-ne, a 2012 anime series
- Reincarnation (film) (originally Rinne), a 2005 Japanese horror film
- Rin-ne, or Kyōkai no Rinne, a 2009 manga series by Rumiko Takahashi
  - Rinne Rokudo, its main character

== Music ==
- Rinne, a song by Band-Maid from the album Conqueror

== Medicine ==
- Rinne test, a screening test for hearing named after Heinrich Adolf Rinne

== Rivers ==
- Rinne (river), in Thuringia, Germany
