= Andrew Teschendorff =

British medical researcher

Andrew E. Teschendorff
- Occupations: Researcher and an academic

Academic background
- Education: B.Sc. (Honors) Mathematical physics Certificate of Advanced Study in Mathematics (Part III); Ph.D., Theoretical particle physics
- Alma mater: University of Edinburgh; University of Cambridge

Andrew E. Teschendorff is a British researcher and an academic. He is professor and principal investigator at the CAS Key Lab of Computational Biology, which is part of the CAS Institute for Nutrition and Health, Shanghai.

Teschendorff's research has contributed towards the development of computational and statistical methods to help analyze and interpret complex multi-omic data, with a particular emphasis on single-cell omic and epigenomic applications in a systems biology context. He has been a recipient of the Heller Research Fellowship, Cambridge-MIT fellowship, and an Advanced International Newton Fellowship from the Royal Society. In 2023, he was a recipient of a Highly Cited Researcher award from Clarivate.

== Education ==
Teschendorff completed a B.Sc. (Honors) in Mathematical physics from the University of Edinburgh in 1995 with first-class honors, receiving the Tait Medal. In 1996, he obtained a distinction in the Certificate of Advanced Study in Mathematics from the University of Cambridge. Later, in 2000, he earned a Ph.D. in Theoretical particle physics from the University of Cambridge. He performed post-doctoral work at the Breast Cancer Functional Genomics Laboratory at the University of Cambridge from 2003 to 2008.

== Career ==
Teschendorff was a member of the Research Group at British Telecom Labs from 2000 to 2001 before joining the University of Warwick as a research assistant within the Mathematical Biology Group, where he remained from 2001 to 2003. He was a senior post-doctoral fellow in Computational Biology at the University of Cambridge between 2003 and 2008. In 2008, he joined University College London where he held the positions of principal research associate in Statistical Cancer Genomics until 2013, as well as Newton Advanced Fellow from 2015 to 2018. He then joined the CAS Max-Planck Partner Institute of Computational Biology in Shanghai, where he was a professor in Computational Systems Epigenomics from 2013 to 2020. Since 2020, he has been a professor and principal investigator at CAS Key Lab of Computational Biology in Shanghai, and in 2015, was named an honorary research fellow at University College London.

== Research ==
While at Cambridge, Teschendorff's bioinformatics work demonstrated the importance of immune-cell infiltration as a significant determinant of clinical outcome in estrogen receptor negative (ER-) breast cancer. His computational methods demonstrated how specific ER binding patterns in estrogen receptor positive (ER+) breast cancer can influence the chance of a tumor undergoing metastasis. He was part of a research team that identified an age-associated DNA methylation signature that appeared consistently across different normal tissue types and was enriched for polycomb group (PCG) target genes.

In subsequent work, he proposed the concept of differential variability to identify cancer risk markers from DNA methylation measurements taken in precancerous lesions using the EVORA and iEVORA algorithms, and demonstrated how the DNA methylation outliers detected from these algorithms can discriminate histologically normal-tissue at cancer-risk from normal healthy tissue. Building on the hypothesis that the cumulative number of stem-cell divisions in a tissue is a determinant of cancer risk, he then built the first epigenetic mitotic clock (epiTOC), showing how DNA methylation changes can be used to track the mitotic age of a tissue which could, in principle, be used for monitoring cancer-risk.

Teschendorff has also explored physics-based approaches for analysing complex single-cell omic data, proposing the concept of signaling network entropy (Single-Cell Entropy-SCENT) as a means of estimating differentiation potency and cellular plasticity from single-cell RNA-Seq data. Building upon the same framework, he subsequently developed the SCIRA algorithm to infer stemness at single-cell resolution from single-cell or single-nucleus RNA-Seq data.

Teschendorff has also developed Beta Mixture Quantile dilation (BMIQ) algorithm and the EpiDISH cell-type deconvolution framework. Alongside colleagues, he is also a co-developer of the integrated analysis pipeline package, named Chip Analysis Methylation Pipeline (ChAMP), which offers a toolkit for analysing EWAS data.

== Awards and honors ==
- 1994 – Tait Medal, University of Edinburgh
- 2003 – Cambridge-MIT Initiative Fellowship
- 2005 – Isaac Newton Trust Fellowship, Isaac Newton Trust
- 2008 – Heller Research Fellowship, University College London
- 2015 – Newton Advanced Fellowship, The Royal Society
- 2019 – Excellent Teachers Award, CAS
- 2023 – Highly Cited Researcher Award, Clarivate

== Selected articles ==
- Teschendorff, Andrew E.; Miremadi, Ahmad; Pinder, Sarah E.; Ellis, Ian O.; Caldas, Carlos (2007). "An immune response gene expression module identifies a good prognosis subtype in estrogen receptor negative breast cancer". Genome Biology. 8 (8): R157. doi:10.1186/gb-2007-8-8-r157. ISSN 1474-760X. PMC 2374988. PMID 17683518.
- Teschendorff, Andrew E.; Menon, Usha; Gentry-Maharaj, Aleksandra; Ramus, Susan J.; Weisenberger, Daniel J.; Shen, Hui; Campan, Mihaela; Noushmehr, Houtan; Bell, Christopher G.; Maxwell, A. Peter; Savage, David A.; Mueller-Holzner, Elisabeth; Marth, Christian; Kocjan, Gabrijela; Gayther, Simon A.; Jones, Allison; Beck, Stephan; Wagner, Wolfgang; Laird, Peter W.; Jacobs, Ian J.; Widschwendter, Martin (April 1, 2010). "Age-dependent DNA methylation of genes that are suppressed in stem cells is a hallmark of cancer". Genome Research. 20 (4): 440–446. doi:10.1101/gr.103606.109. ISSN 1088-9051. PMC 2847747. PMID 20219944.
- Ross-Innes, Caryn S.; Stark, Rory; Teschendorff, Andrew E.; Holmes, Kelly A.; Ali, H. Raza; Dunning, Mark J.; Brown, Gordon D.; Gojis, Ondrej; Ellis, Ian O.; Green, Andrew R.; Ali, Simak; Chin, Suet-Feung; Palmieri, Carlo; Caldas, Carlos; Carroll, Jason S. (January 2012). "Differential oestrogen receptor binding is associated with clinical outcome in breast cancer". Nature. 481 (7381): 389–393. Bibcode:2012Natur.481..389R. doi:10.1038/nature10730. ISSN 1476-4687. PMC 3272464. PMID 22217937.
- Teschendorff, Andrew E.; Marabita, Francesco; Lechner, Matthias; Bartlett, Thomas; Tegner, Jesper; Gomez-Cabrero, David; Beck, Stephan (January 15, 2013). "A beta-mixture quantile normalization method for correcting probe design bias in Illumina Infinium 450 k DNA methylation data". Bioinformatics. 29 (2): 189–196. doi:10.1093/bioinformatics/bts680. ISSN 1367-4811. PMC 3546795. PMID 23175756.
- Teschendorff, Andrew E.; Enver, Tariq (June 1, 2017). "Single-cell entropy for accurate estimation of differentiation potency from a cell's transcriptome". Nature Communications. 8 (1) 15599. Bibcode:2017NatCo...815599T. doi:10.1038/ncomms15599. ISSN 2041-1723. PMC 5461595. PMID 28569836.
