= Multi-Omics Profiling Expression Database =

MOPED

Content
- Description: MOPED enables discoveries through consistently processed multi-omics data

Contact
- Research center: Seattle Children's Research Institute
- Authors: Roger Higdon
- Primary citation: Higdon R, et al.
- Release date: 2012

Access
- Website: MOPED

The Multi-Omics Profiling Expression Database (MOPED) was an expanding multi-omics resource that supports rapid browsing of transcriptomics and proteomics information from publicly available studies on model organisms and humans. As to date (2021) it has ceased activities and is unaccessible online.

== Systematic Protein Investigative Research Environment ==
MOPED is designed to simplify the comparison and sharing of data for the greater research community. MOPED employs the standardized analysis pipeline SPIRE to uniquely provide protein level absolute and relative expression data, meta- analysis capabilities and quantitative data. Processed relative expression transcriptomics data were obtained from the Gene Expression Omnibus (GEO). Data can be queried for specific proteins and genes, browsed based on organism, tissue, localization and condition, and sorted by false discovery rate and expression. MOPED empowers users to visualize their own expression data and compare it with existing studies. Further, MOPED links to various protein and pathway data- bases, including GeneCards, Panther, Entrez, UniProt, KEGG, SEED, and Reactome. Protein and gene identifiers are integrated from GeneCards (cross-referenced with MOPED), Genbank, RefSeq, UniProt, WormBase, and Saccharomyces Genome Database (SGD). The current version of MOPED (MOPED 2.5, 2014) contains approximately 5 million total records including ~260 experiments and ~390 conditions. MOPED is developed and supported by the Kolker team at Seattle Children's Research Institute.

== Model Organism Protein Expression Database ==
MOPED was previously known as the Model Organism Protein Expression Database, before changing its name to the Multi-Omics Profiling Expression Database.
