= Systematic Protein Investigative Research Environment =

Content
- Description: web based mass spectrometry (MS) proteomics analysis tool

Contact
- Research center: Seattle Children's Research Institute
- Laboratory: Bioinformatics & High-throughput Analysis Laboratory
- Authors: Eugene Kolker
- Primary citation: Kolker, et al.
- Release date: 2011

Access
- Website: SPIRE

Systematic Protein Investigative Research Environment (SPIRE) provides web-based experiment-specific mass spectrometry (MS) proteomics analysis in order to identify proteins and peptides, and label-free expression and relative expression analyses. SPIRE provides a web-interface and generates results in both interactive and simple data formats.

== Methodology ==
Spire's analyses are based on an experimental design that generates false discovery rates and local false discovery rates (FDR, LFDR) and integrates open-source search and data analysis methods. By combining X! Tandem, OMSSA and SpectraST SPIRE can produce an increase in protein IDs (50-90%) over current combinations of scoring and single search engines while also providing accurate multi-faceted error estimation. SPIRE combines its analysis results with data on protein function, pathways and protein expression from model organisms.

== Integration with other information ==
SPIRE also connects results to publicly available proteomics data through its Multi-Omics Profiling Expression Database (MOPED). SPIRE can provide analysis and annotation for user-supplied protein ID and expression data. Users can upload data (standardized appropriately) or mail in data files.
