= Partner Institute for Computational Biology =

The CAS-MPG Partner Institute for Computational Biology (PICB) was jointly established by the Chinese Academy of Sciences (CAS) and the German Max Planck Society (MPG) in May 2005. It is located in Xu Hui district in Shanghai, P. R. China.

The institute focuses its research on the interface between theoretical and experimental molecular and cell biology. The procedures of the establishment of the institute as well as the recruitment of the directors follows the model of the Max-Planck-Society, while the institute itself is integral part of and administrated by the Shanghai Institutes for Biological Sciences (SIBS). The institute was closed in 2020.
