= Single-cell multi-omics integration =

Computational methods in biology

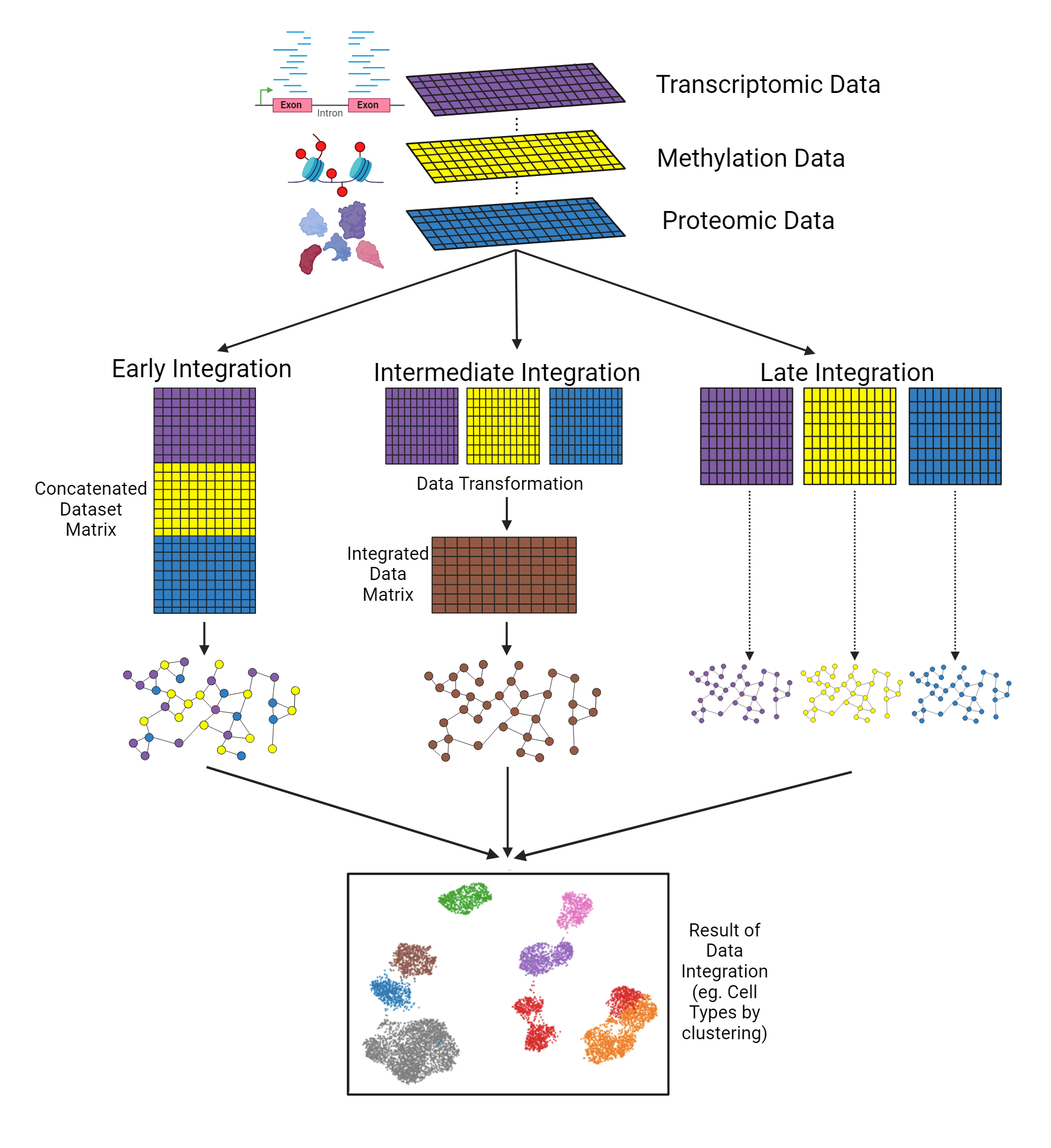
Schematic of the different single-cell multi-omic integration strategies. Adapted from Adossa et al., 2021

Single-cell multi-omics integration describes a suite of computational methods used to harmonize information from multiple "omes" to jointly analyze biological phenomena. This approach allows researchers to discover intricate relationships between different chemical-physical modalities by drawing associations across various molecular layers simultaneously. Multi-omics integration approaches can be categorized into four broad categories: Early integration, intermediate integration, late integration methods. Multi-omics integration can enhance experimental robustness by providing independent sources of evidence to address hypotheses, leveraging modality-specific strengths to compensate for another's weaknesses through imputation, and offering cell-type clustering and visualizations that are more aligned with reality

== Background ==
The emergence of single-cell sequencing technologies has revolutionized our understanding of cellular heterogeneity, uncovering a nuanced landscape of cell types and their associations with biological processes.

Single-cell omics technologies have extended beyond the transcriptome to profile diverse physical and chemical properties at single-cell resolution, including whole genomes/exomes, DNA methylation, chromatin accessibility, histone modifications, epitranscriptome (e.g., mRNAs, microRNAs, tRNAs, lncRNAs), proteome, phosphoproteome, metabolome, and more.

There is an expanding repository of publicly available single-cell datasets, such as the Human Cell Atlas Project (HCA), the Cancer Genome Atlas (TCGA), and the ENCODE project.

Single-cell multi-omics integration can reveal underappreciated relationships between chemical-physical modalities, broaden the definition of cell states beyond single modality feature profiles, and provide independent evidence during analysis to support testing of biological hypotheses. However, the high dimensionality (features > observations), high degree of stochastic technical and biological variability, and sparsity of single-cell data (low molecule recovery efficiency) make computational integration a challenging problem. Furthermore, different solutions for multi-omics integration are available depending on factors such as whether the data is matched (simultaneous measurements derived from the same cell) or unmatched (measurements derived from different cells), whether cell-type annotations are available, or whether modality feature conversion is available, with different implementations tailored to suit the specific use case. As such, there are multiple approaches to single-cell data integration, each with a distinct use case, and each with its own set of advantages and disadvantages.

== Approaches to multi-omics integration ==
=== Early integration ===
Early integration is a method that concatenates (by binding rows and columns) two or more omics datasets into a single data matrix. Some advantages of early integration are that the approach is simple, highly interpretable, and capable of capturing relationships between features from different modalities. Early integration is primarily employed to merge datasets of the same datatype (e.g., integrating two distinct scRNA-seq datasets). This is because integrating datasets from different modalities may lead to a combined feature set with variable feature value ranges. For instance, expression data often spans a wider range compared to accessibility data, which typically ranges between values of 0 and 2.

Early integration approaches produce data matrices with higher dimensionality compared to the original matrix. As such, dimensionality reduction methods such as feature selection and feature extraction are often necessary steps for downstream analysis. Feature selection involves retaining only the important variables from the original omic layers, while feature extraction transforms the original input features into combinations of the original features. The projection of high-dimensional data into a lower-dimensional space reduces noise and simplifies the dataset, resulting in easier data handling.

=== Intermediate integration ===
Intermediate integration describes a class of approaches which aim to analyze multiple omic datasets simultaneously without the need for prior data transformation (as this occurs during data integration). Several examples of intermediate integration include similarity-based integration, joint dimension reduction, and statistical modelling.

==== Similarity-based integration ====
Similarity-based integration aims to identify patterns across multi-omic datasets through the use of spectral clustering (e.g. Spectrum and PC-MSC). Spectral clustering cluster cells based on either similarity matrices derived from a multi-omic dataset or graph fusion algorithms (e.g. Seurat4) which construct graphs from individual omics layers and merges them into a single graph.

==== Joint dimension reduction ====
Joint dimension reduction aims to reduce the complexity of multi-omics data by projecting observations onto a lower dimensional latent space such that the different omics layers can be analyzed together. Canonical correlation analysis (CCA), non-negative matrix factorization (NMF) and manifold alignment are popular approaches for joint dimensionality reduction. Tools that use CCA or its derivative sparse CCA, such as Seurat3 and bindSC identify linear relationships between datasets by identifying linear combinations of variables that maximize feature correlation. Tools which use NMF (e.g. LIGER and coupledNMF) extract low-dimensional representations of high-dimensional data such that both shared and dataset-specific factors across the multiple omics datasets can be identified. Manifold alignment (eg., MATCHER and MAGAN) refers to an approach where low dimension representations of various multi-omic datasets are computed individually and then represented as a common latent space.

==== Statistical modeling ====
Various statistical approaches, including the probabilistic Bayesian modeling framework (which allows for the incorporation of prior knowledge and uncertainties into the analysis), can be used to integrate multi-omic datasets. For instance, BREM-SC employ a Bayesian clustering framework to jointly cluster multi-omic datasets, while other tools like clonealign utilizes Bayesian methods to integrate gene expression and copy number profiles for studying cancer clones.

=== Late integration ===
Late integration aims to preprocess and model omics modalities separately, and then combine the two models at the end. The advantage of late integration is that tailored tools for each omics modality can be applied per modality. While late integration approaches are commonly used in the context of bulk multi-omics studies (e.g., cluster-of-clusters analysis and Kernel Learning Integrative Clustering), late integration approaches to single cell integration is still a novel field. For example, ensemble learning techniques such as ensemble clustering (e.g. SAME-clustering, Sc-GPE, EC-PGMGR), have demonstrated potential in aggregating clustering results from different sources. These methods combine the clustering results from different omics datasets to create a consensus clustering which models the relationships between the individual clustering results to find an improved global clustering solution across the different modalities.

As late integration involves analyzing each individual omics layer separately before integrating the results into a consensus result, it may fail to capture interactions and relationships across different omics modalities. As such, some groups argue that late integration represents multiple parallel single-omics analysis conducted on multiple data types, rather than fulfilling the "true goal" of multi-omics integration, which is to discover inter-omics relationships present in multi-omics data.

Single-Cell Multi-Omic Integration Tools
Tool	Benchmarked Modalities Supported	Integration Strategy
BindSC	Transcriptome and chromatin accessibility	Intermediate
BREM-SC	Transcriptome and proteome	Early or Intermediate
CiteFuse	Transcriptome and proteome	Late
Clonealign	Transcriptome and genome	Intermediate
CoupledNMF	Transcriptome and chromatin accessibility data	Intermediate
LIGER	Transcriptome, spatial gene expression, methylome, and chromatin accessibility	Intermediate
MAGAN	Multiplexed immunohistochemistry and transcriptome	Intermediate
MMD-MA	Transcriptome and methylome	Intermediate
MOFA+	Transcriptome and chromatin accessibility	Early or Intermediate
SCHEMA	Transcriptome, chromatin accessibility, and spatial gene expression	Intermediate
scMVAE	Transcriptome and chromatin accessibility	Intermediate
Seurat3	Transcriptome and chromatin accessibility	Intermediate or Late
Seurat4	Transcriptome, chromatin accessibility and proteome	Intermediate or Late
Seurat5	Transcriptome, proteome, methylome and hashtag oligos	Intermediate or Late
Spectrum	Transcriptome, miRNA, and proteome	Intermediate
TotalVI	Transcriptome and proteome	Intermediate
UniCom	Transcriptome and methylome	Intermediate

== Considerations for multi-omics data integration ==
=== Noise ===
As single-cell data is prone to noise from both biological and technical sources, developing robust de-noising methods to mitigate noise may be necessary. In the context of single-cell experiments, biological variation arising from factors such as transcriptional bursts, differences in cell cycle, and cell microenvironment can introduce noise to the dataset. Additionally, technical variability resulting from factors like poor sequence quality, uneven sequence coverage, and sample contamination must also be addressed.

=== Dataset compatibility ===
Integrating different omic modalities can be challenging due to differences in the structure of different datasets. For example, scRNA-seq features are expressed on a continuous scale whereas chromatin accessibility data (i.e. scATAC-seq) exists between 0–2 (two copies of each region per cell). As such, integration of different modalities may require additional steps to transform the datasets into a common latent space. Even then, integration strategies such as early integration may still be prone to issues of bias if the resulting matrix is disproportionately represented by features from one specific modality.

=== Dimensionality ===
Analyzing large-scale single-cell multi-omics datasets can be computationally intensive because of the high dimensionality of the datasets. Hence, the tools employed for integrating datasets must be computationally efficient, or computational methods should be utilized initially to reduce the dimensionality of the datasets (refer to dimensionality reduction).

=== Interpretability and validation ===
Many integration methods focus on statistical associations rather than detailed causal modeling. As such, interpreting and validating the results can be particularly challenging, especially if a neural network was utilized, as these methods are black boxes. The utility and validation of integration methods need to be assessed based on practical applications, such as accurately identifying biologically relevant multi-omic relationships.

=== Matched and unmatched data ===
The integration of single-cell multi-omic data presents different challenges depending on whether the datasets are matched or unmatched. Matched datasets refer to multiple omic layers that are measured from the same individual cell whereas unmatched data refer to dataset that are measured from a different set of cells. While matched datasets enable direct comparisons between the different omics layers within the same cell, they may not be as readily available as unmatched datasets. On the other hand, while unmatched datasets allow for the integration of different sources and conditions, they require considerations of potential biases and confounding factors (e.g., differences in cell populations, experimental conditions, or sample preparation methods between different datasets). Several approaches to multi-omics integration for unmatched data include matching by cell group (requires cell type annotations), matching by shared features, or statistical approaches such as NMF.

== Applications and uses ==
While single-modality datasets have proven to be a mainstay in systems biology, combining biological information across multiple modalities has the potential to address biological questions that cannot be inferred by a single data type alone.

=== Modelling biological networks ===
For example, the integration of transcriptome and DNA accessibility has enabled the development of bioinformatic tools to infer cell-type-specific gene regulatory networks. This is achieved by leveraging transcription factor and target gene expression along with cis-regulatory information to impute relevant transcription factors and their regulatory partners.

=== Expanding definitions of cell state ===
Another application for multi omics integration is in expanding definitions of cell states incorporating features observed across multiple modalities. For instance, integrating protein marker detection with transcriptome profiling using a multi-omics sequencing technology such as CITE-seq can resolve cell state signatures based on joint gene regulatory and surface marker expression. This enables more robust inferences regarding cellular phenotypes, which are akin to and directly comparable with results from classical flow cytometry. Moreover, defining cell states based on clustering analysis within an integrated latent space may offer more stable estimations of cellular phenotypes compared to analysis within a single-modality latent space.

=== Imputation ===
Furthermore, multi omics integration can overcome modality-specific limitations through imputation. For example, most spatial transcriptomic sequencing technologies suffer from limited spatial resolution (pixels comprising a mixture of local cells) and low feature complexity. Integration of spatial transcriptomics with scRNAseq can help overcome these limitations by supporting the spatial deconvolution of low-resolution readouts and estimating the frequencies of each cell type.

== See also ==
- Cell sorting
- List of single cell omics methods
- Multiomics
- Single-cell analysis
- Single-cell transcriptomics
- Single-cell variability
