= Single-cell analysis =

Study of biochemical processes in an individual cell

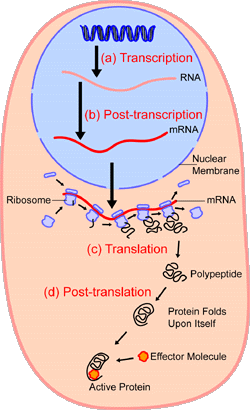
This single cell shows the process of the central dogma of molecular biology, which are all steps researchers are interested to quantify (DNA, RNA, and Protein).

In cell biology, single-cell analysis and subcellular analysis refer to the study of genomics, transcriptomics, proteomics, metabolomics, and cell–cell interactions at the level of an individual cell, as opposed to more conventional methods which study bulk populations of many cells.

The concept of single-cell analysis originated in the 1970s. Before the discovery of heterogeneity, single-cell analysis mainly referred to the analysis or manipulation of an individual cell within a bulk population of cells under the influence of a particular condition using optical or electron microscopy. Due to the heterogeneity seen in both eukaryotic and prokaryotic cell populations, analyzing the biochemical processes and features of a single cell makes it possible to discover mechanisms which are too subtle or infrequent to be detectable when studying a bulk population of cells; in conventional multi-cell analysis, this variability is usually masked by the average behavior of the larger population. Technologies such as fluorescence-activated cell sorting allow the precise isolation of selected single cells from complex samples, while high-throughput single-cell partitioning technologies enable the simultaneous molecular analysis of hundreds or thousands of individual unsorted cells; this is particularly useful for the analysis of variations in gene expression between genotypically identical cells, allowing the definition of otherwise undetectable cell subtypes.

The development of new technologies is increasing scientists' ability to analyze the genome and transcriptome of single cells, and to quantify their proteome and metabolome. Mass spectrometry techniques have become important analytical tools for proteomic and metabolomic analysis of single cells. Recent advances have enabled the quantification of thousands of proteins across hundreds of single cells, making possible new types of analysis. In situ sequencing and fluorescence in situ hybridization (FISH) do not require that cells be isolated and are increasingly being used for analysis of tissues.

== Single-cell isolation ==
Many single-cell analysis techniques require the isolation of individual cells. Methods currently used for single-cell isolation include: dielectrophoretic digital sorting, enzymatic digestion, fluorescence-activated cell sorter, hydrodynamic traps, laser capture microdissection, manual picking, microfluidics, inkjet printing, micromanipulation, serial dilution, and Raman tweezers.

Manual single-cell picking is a method where cells in suspension are viewed under a microscope and individually picked using a micropipette. The Raman tweezers technique combines Raman spectroscopy with optical tweezers, using a laser beam to trap and manipulate cells.

The dielectrophoretic digital sorting method utilizes a semiconductor-controlled array of electrodes in a microfluidic chip to trap single cells in dielectrophoretic (DEP) cages. Cell identification is ensured by the combination of fluorescent markers with image observation. Precision delivery is ensured by the semiconductor-controlled motion of DEP cages in the flow cell.

Inkjet printing combines microfluidics with MEMS on a CMOS chip to provide individual control over a large number of print nozzles, using the same technology as home Inkjet printing. Inkjet printing allows for the adjustment of shear force to the sample ejection, greatly improving cell survivability. This approach, when combined with optical inspection and AI-driven image recognition, not only guarantees single-cell dispensing into the well plate or other medium but also can qualify the cell sample for quality of sample, rejecting defective cells, debris, and fragments.

The development of hydrodynamic-based microfluidic biochips has been increasing over the years. In this technique, the cells or particles are trapped in a particular region for single-cell analysis, usually without application of any external force fields such as optical, electrical, magnetic, or acoustic. There is a need to explore the insights of SCA in the cell's natural state and development of these techniques is highly essential for that study. Researchers have highlighted the vast potential field that needs to be explored to develop biochip devices to suit market/researcher demands. Hydrodynamic microfluidics facilitates the development of passive lab-on-chip applications.

Hydrodynamic traps allow for the isolation of an individual cell in a "trap" at a single given time by passive microfluidic transport. The number of isolated cells can be manipulated based on the number of traps in the system.

The Laser Capture Microdissection technique utilizes a laser to dissect and separate individual cells, or sections, from tissue samples of interest. The methods involve the observation of a cell under a microscope, so that a section for analysis can be identified and labeled so that the laser can cut the cell. Then, the cell can be extracted for analysis.

Microfluidics allows for the isolation of individual cells for further analyses. The following principles outline the various microfluidic processes for single-cell separation: droplet-in-oil-based isolation, pneumatic membrane valving, and hydrodynamic cell traps. Droplet-in-oil-based microfluidics uses oil-filled channels to hold separated aqueous droplets. This allows the single cell to be contained and isolated from inside the oil-based channels. Pneumatic membrane valves manipulate air pressure to isolate individual cells by membrane deflection. The manipulation of the pressure source allows the opening or closing of channels in a microfluidic network. Typically, the system requires an operator and is limited in throughput.

== Genomics ==
=== Techniques ===
Single-cell genomics is heavily dependent on increasing the copies of DNA found in the cell so that there is enough statistical power for accurate sequencing. This has led to the development of strategies for whole genome amplification (WGA). Currently, WGA strategies can be grouped into three categories:

- Controlled priming and PCR amplification: Adapter-Linker PCR WGA
- Random priming and PCR amplification: DOP-PCR, MALBAC
- Random priming and isothermal amplification: MDA

The Adapter-Linker PCR WGA is reported in many comparative studies to be the best-performing technique for diploid single-cell mutation analysis, thanks to its very low Allelic Dropout effect, and for copy number variation profiling due to its low noise, both with aCGH and with NGS low Pass Sequencing. This method is only applicable to human cells, both fixed and unfixed.

One widely adopted WGA technique is called degenerate oligonucleotide–primed polymerase chain reaction (DOP-PCR). This method uses the well established DNA amplification method PCR to try and amplify the entire genome using a large set of primers. Although simple, this method has been shown to have very low genome coverage. An improvement on DOP-PCR is Multiple displacement amplification (MDA), which uses random primers and a high fidelity enzyme, usually Φ29 DNA polymerase, to accomplish the amplification of larger fragments and greater genome coverage than DOP-PCR. Despite these improvements MDA still has a sequence-dependent bias (certain parts of the genome are amplified more than others because of their sequence, causing some parts to be overrepresented in the resulting genomic dataset). The method shown to largely avoid the biases seen in DOP-PCR and MDA is Multiple Annealing and Looping–Based Amplification Cycles (MALBAC). Bias in this system is reduced by only copying off the original DNA strand instead of making copies of copies. The main drawback to using MALBAC is that it has reduced accuracy compared to DOP-PCR and MDA due to the enzyme used to copy the DNA.

Once amplified using any of the above techniques, the DNA can be sequenced using Sanger sequencing or next-generation sequencing (NGS).

=== Purpose ===
There are two major applications to studying the genome at the single-cell level. One application is to track the changes that occur in bacterial populations, where phenotypic differences are often seen. These differences are easily missed by bulk sequencing of a population, but can be observed in single-cell sequencing. The second major application is to study the genetic evolution of cancer. Since cancer cells are constantly mutating it is of great interest to researchers to see how cancers evolve at the level of individual cells. These patterns of somatic mutations and copy number aberration can be observed using single-cell sequencing.

== Transcriptomics ==
=== Techniques ===
Single-cell transcriptomics uses sequencing techniques similar to single-cell genomics or direct detection using fluorescence in situ hybridization. The first step in quantifying the transcriptome is to convert RNA to cDNA using reverse transcriptase so that the contents of the cell can be sequenced using NGS methods as was done in genomics. Once converted, there is not enough cDNA to be sequenced so the same DNA amplification techniques discussed in single-cell genomics are applied to the cDNA to make sequencing possible. Alternatively, fluorescent compounds attached to RNA hybridization probes are used to identify specific sequences and sequential application of different RNA probes will build up a comprehensive transcriptome.

=== Purpose ===
The purpose of single-cell transcriptomics is to determine what genes are being expressed in each individual cell. The transcriptome is often used to quantify gene expression instead of the proteome because of the difficulty currently associated with amplifying protein levels sufficiently to make them convenient to study.

There are three major reasons gene expression has been studied using this technique: to study gene dynamics, RNA splicing, and for cell typing. Gene dynamics are usually studied to determine what changes in gene expression affect different cell characteristics. For example, this type of transcriptomic analysis has often been used to study embryonic development. RNA splicing studies are focused on understanding the regulation of different transcript isoforms. Single-cell transcriptomics has also been used for cell typing, where the genes expressed in a cell are used to identify and classify different types of cells. The main goal in cell typing is to find a way to determine the identity of cells that do not express known genetic markers.

RNA expression can serve as a proxy for protein abundance. However, protein abundance is governed by the complex interplay between RNA expression and post-transcriptional processes. While more challenging technically, translation can be monitored by ribosome profiling in single cells.

== Proteomics ==
=== Techniques ===
There are three major approaches to single-cell proteomics: antibody-based methods, fluorescent protein-based methods, and mass spectroscopy-based methods.

==== Antibody–based methods ====
The antibody based methods use designed antibodies to bind to proteins of interest, allowing the relative abundance of multiple individual targets to be identified by one of several different techniques.

Imaging: Antibodies can be bound to fluorescent molecules such as quantum dots or tagged with organic fluorophores for detection by fluorescence microscopy. Since different colored quantum dots or unique fluorophores are attached to each antibody it is possible to identify multiple different proteins in a single cell. Quantum dots can be washed off of the antibodies without damaging the sample, making it possible to do multiple rounds of protein quantification using this method on the same sample. For the methods based on organic fluorophores, the fluorescent tags are attached by a reversible linkage such as a DNA-hybrid (that can be melted/dissociated under low-salt conditions) or chemically inactivated, allowing multiple cycles of analysis, with 3-5 targets quantified per cycle. These approaches have been used for quantifying protein abundance in patient biopsy samples (e.g. cancer) to map variable protein expression in tissues and/or tumors, and to measure changes in protein expression and cell signaling in response to cancer treatment.

Mass Cytometry: rare metal isotopes, not normally found in cells or tissues, can be attached to the individual antibodies and detected by mass spectrometry for simultaneous and sensitive identification of proteins. These techniques can be highly multiplexed for simultaneous quantification of many targets (panels of up to 38 markers) in single cells.

Antibody-DNA quantification: another antibody-based method converts protein levels to DNA levels. The conversion to DNA makes it possible to amplify protein levels and use NGS to quantify proteins. In one such approach, two antibodies are selected for each protein needed to be quantified. The two antibodies are then modified to have single stranded DNA connected to them that are complementary. When the two antibodies bind to a protein the complementary strands will anneal and produce a double stranded segment of DNA that can then be amplified using PCR. Each pair of antibodies designed for one protein is tagged with a different DNA sequence. The DNA amplified from PCR can then be sequenced, and the protein levels quantified.

==== Mass spectrometry–based methods ====
In mass spectroscopy-based proteomics there are three major steps needed for peptide identification: sample preparation, separation of peptides, and identification of peptides. Several groups have focused on oocytes or very early cleavage-stage cells since these cells are unusually large and provide enough material for analysis. Another approach, single cell proteomics by mass spectrometry (SCoPE-MS) has quantified thousands of proteins in mammalian cells with typical cell sizes (diameter of 10-15 μm) by combining carrier-cells and single-cell barcoding. The second generation, SCoPE2, increased the throughput by automated and miniaturized sample preparation; It also improved quantitative reliability and proteome coverage by data-driven optimization of LC-MS/MS and peptide identification. The sensitivity and consistency of these methods have been further improved by prioritization, and massively parallel sample preparation in nanoliter size droplets. Another direction for single-cell protein analysis is based on a scalable framework of multiplexed data-independent acquisition (plexDIA) enables time saving by parallel analysis of both peptide ions and protein samples, thereby realizing multiplicative gains in throughput.

The separation of differently sized proteins can be accomplished by using capillary electrophoresis (CE) or liquid chromatography (LC) (using liquid chromatography with mass spectroscopy is also known as LC-MS). This step gives order to the peptides before quantification using tandem mass-spectroscopy (MS/MS). The major difference between quantification methods is some use labels on the peptides such as tandem mass tags (TMT) or dimethyl labels which are used to identify which cell a certain protein came from (proteins coming from each cell have a different label) while others do not use labels but rather quantify cells individually. The mass spectroscopy data is then analyzed by running data through databases that count the peptides identified to quantify protein levels. These methods are very similar to those used to quantify the proteome of bulk cells, with modifications to accommodate the very small sample volume.

===== Ionization techniques used in mass spectrometry-based single-cell analysis =====
A huge variety of ionization techniques can be used to analyze single cells. The choice of ionization method is crucial for analyte detection. It can be decisive which type of compounds are ionizable and in which state they appear, e.g., charge and possible fragmentation of the ions. A few examples of ionization are mentioned in the paragraphs below.

====== Nano-DESI ======
One of the possible ways to measure the content of single cells is nano-DESI (nanospray desorption electrospray ionization). Unlike desorption electrospray ionization, which is a desorption technique, nano-DESI is a liquid extraction technique that enables the sampling of small surfaces, therefore suitable for single-cell analysis. In nano-DESI, two fused silica capillaries are set up in a V-shaped form, closing an angle of approx. 85 degrees. The two capillaries are touching therefore a liquid bridge can be formed between them and enable the sampling of surfaces as small as a single cell. The primary capillary delivers the solvent to the sample surface where the extraction happens and the secondary capillary directs the solvent with extracted molecules to the MS inlet. Nano-DESI mass spectrometry (MS) enables sensitive molecular profiling and quantification of endogenous species as small as a few hundred fmol-s in single cells in a higher throughput manner. Lanekoff et al. identified 14 amino acids, 6 metabolites, and several lipid molecules from single cheek cells using nano-DESI MS.

====== LAESI ======
In Laser ablation electrospray ionization (LAESI), a laser is used to ablate the surface of the sample and the emitted molecules are ionized in the gas phase by charged droplets from electrospray. Similar to DESI the ionization happens in ambient conditions. Anderton et al. used this ionization technique coupled to a Fourier transform mass spectrometer to analyze 200 single cells of Allium cepa (red onion) with high spatial resolution.

====== SIMS ======
Secondary-ion mass spectrometry (SIMS) is a technique similar to DESI, but while DESI is an ambient ionization technique, SIMS happens in vacuum. The solid sample surface is bombarded by a highly focused beam of primary ions. As they hit the surface, molecules are emitted from the surface and ionized. The choice of primary ions determines the size of the beam and also the extent of ionization and fragmentation. Pareek et al. performed metabolomics to trace how purines are synthesized within purinosomes and used isotope labeling and SIMS imaging to directly observe hotspots of metabolic activity within frozen HeLa cells.

====== MALDI ======
In matrix-assisted laser desorption and ionization (MALDI), the sample is incorporated in a chemical matrix that is capable of absorbing energy from a laser. Similar to SIMS, ionization happens in vacuum. Laser irradiation ablates the matrix material from the surface and results in charged gas phase matrix particles, with the analyte molecules ionized from this charged chemical matrix. Liu et al. used MALDI-MS to detect eight phospholipids from single A549 cells. MALDI MS imaging can be used for spatial metabolomics and single-cell analysis.

=== Purpose ===
The purpose of studying the proteome is to better understand the activity of proteins at the single-cell level. Since proteins are responsible for determining how the cell acts, understanding the proteome of single cells gives the best understanding of how a cell operates, and how gene expression changes in a cell due to different environmental stimuli. Although transcriptomics has the same purpose as proteomics it is not as accurate at determining gene expression in cells as it does not take into account post-transcriptional regulation (not all messenger RNA transcripts are actually translated into proteins). Transcriptomics is still important, of course, as studying the difference between RNA levels and protein levels can give insight regarding which genes are post-transcriptionally regulated.

== Metabolomics ==
=== Techniques ===
There are four major methods used to quantify the metabolome of single cells; they are: fluorescence–based detection, fluorescence biosensors, FRET biosensors, and mass spectroscopy. The first three methods listed use fluorescence microscopy to detect molecules in a cell. Usually these assays use small fluorescent tags attached to molecules of interest, however this has been shown be too invasive for single cell metabolomics, and alters the activity of the metabolites. The current solution to this problem is to use fluorescent proteins which will act as metabolite detectors, fluorescing whenever they bind to a metabolite of interest.

Mass spectroscopy is becoming the most frequently used method for single cell metabolomics. Its advantages are that there is no need to develop fluorescent proteins for all molecules of interest, and is capable of detecting metabolites in the femtomole range. Similar to the methods discussed in proteomics, there has also been success in combining mass spectroscopy with separation techniques such as capillary electrophoresis to quantify metabolites. This method is also capable of detecting metabolites present in femtomole concentrations. Another method utilizing capillary microsampling combined with mass spectrometry with ion mobility separation has been demonstrated to enhance the molecular coverage and ion separation for single cell metabolomics. Furthermore, direct infusion mass spectrometry, so call-ed live-single cell mass spectrometry, has also been successfully performed on human cells. Researchers are trying to develop a technique that can fulfil what current techniques are lacking: high throughput, higher sensitivity for metabolites that have a lower abundance or that have low ionization efficiencies, good replicability and that allow quantification of metabolites.

=== Purpose ===
The purpose of single cell metabolomics is to gain a better understanding at the molecular level of major biological topics such as: cancer, stem cells, aging, as well as the development of drug resistance. In general the focus of metabolomics is mostly on understanding how cells deal with environmental stresses at the molecular level, and to give a more dynamic understanding of cellular functions.

== Reconstructing developmental trajectories ==
Single-cell transcriptomic assays have allowed reconstruction development trajectories. Branching of these trajectories describes cell differentiation. Various methods have been developed for reconstructing branching developmental trajectories from single-cell transcriptomic data.. A comprehensive benchmarking of merhods can be found here. They use various advanced mathematical concepts from optimal transportation to principal graphs. and Hodge Laplacians. Some software libraries for reconstruction and visualization of lineage differentiation trajectories are freely available online.

== Cell–cell interaction ==
Cell–cell interactions are characterized by stable and transient interactions.

== See also ==
- Cell sorting
- CITE-Seq
- Micro-arrays for mass spectrometry
- Single-cell variability
- Single-cell multi-omics integration
