= Certificate of Advanced Study =

Post-master's academic certificate

A Certificate of Advanced Study (CAS), also called an Advanced Certificate (Adv Cert, Adv. Cert.), or Certificate of Advanced Graduate Study (CAGS), is a post-Master's academic certificate designed for professional and non traditional students, as well as practitioners who seek a continuing education program to enhance their professional development in fields such as liberal arts, education, library science, software engineering, area studies, data science, public policy, and management.

== Examples ==
Liberal Arts certificates of advanced graduate study are offered by some institutions that offer master's degrees in interdisciplinary liberal arts. These certificate programs are designed to hone critical thinking skills and personal knowledge of a chosen field, in addition to encouraging professional development. They typically require 30 hours of graduate study beyond the master's degree.

For some disciplines, this certificate requires a three-year post-bachelor's program equivalent to a specialist's degree. For example, School Psychologists must earn an MA/AC or CAS (Master's degree plus Advanced Certification) or Ed.S degree in order to practice in a school setting or be eligible for national certification. These are all Specialist-level degrees due to a required 1200-hour internship experience and 60+ hours of graduate study.

Library and information science CAS programs are intended to allow students to closely focus on a particular sub-area of library and information science after earning a master's degree in the discipline. Some students advance directly to the CAS after finishing their master's degree, others return for a CAS after working in the field. The certificate generally takes one to two years to complete, including a culminating cumulative exam or extensive project. Such programs are offered by many, but not all, of the U.S. institutions of higher education that issue American Library Association-accredited master's degrees.

At the University of Lausanne and EPFL, a Certificate of Advanced Studies is awarded upon completion of a programme comprising at least 120 contact hours (resulting in between 10 and 29 ECTS credits), a written examination and, in certain cases, a dissertation.

Some CAGS are connected to an existing doctoral program such as PhD in Organizational Leadership: for example, PhD students receive a CAGS in Leadership Studies after completing their 2 years of doctoral study at Eastern University.

== See also ==
- Graduate certificate
