= Vladimir Baranov =

Soviet-born Canadian scientist

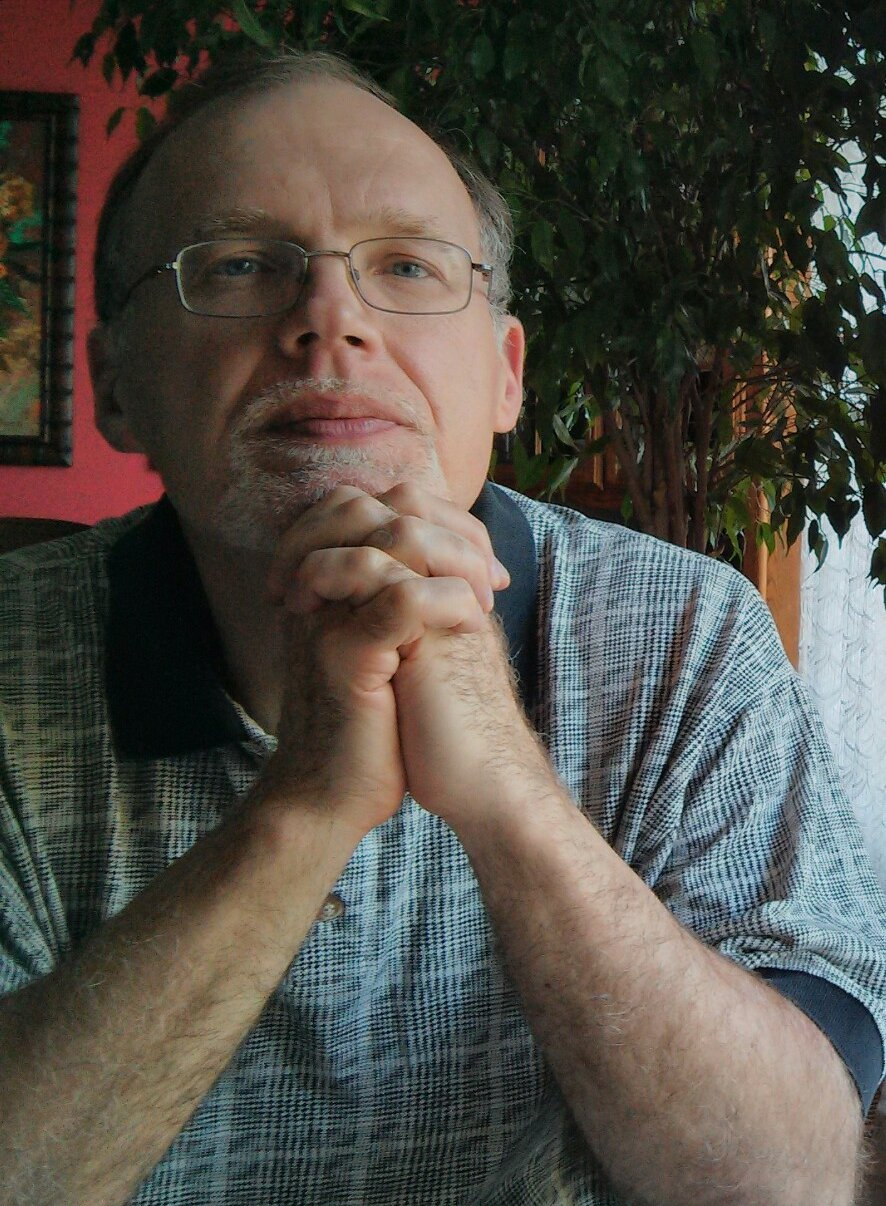
Vladimir Baranov Scientist

Vladimir Baranov is a Soviet born Canadian scientist and one of the original co-inventors of Mass cytometry technology...

He co-founded DVS Sciences in 2004 (acquired by Fluidigm in 2014 and then renamed to Standard BioTools in 2022) along with Dmitry Bandura, Scott D. Tanner and Olga Ornatsky.

== Biography ==
In 1993, he immigrated to Canada. Prior to the formation of DVS Sciences. Dr. Baranov, a senior scientist at MDS SCIEX, was a key member of the research team that developed and promoted the Dynamic Reaction Cell®, which remains today at the pinnacle of quadrupole ICP-MS technology.

In 2005, together with Scott D. Tanner and Dmitry Bandura, he began independently developing an ICP-TOF-MS based cytometer and became a researcher at the University of Toronto in March 2005. After securing ample funding by 2010 from various sources, including National Institutes of Health, Ontario Institute for Cancer Research (OICR), the Ministry of Research and Innovation, Ontario Centres of Excellence, Health Technology Exchange, and Genome Canada via the Ontario Genomics Institute, and venture capital from 5 AM Ventures, Vladimir and the DVS Sciences team successfully commercialized their technology, leading to the acquisition of DVS Sciences by Fluidigm in 2014

Baranov was a principal scientist at DVS Sciences (and then Fluidigm) developing instrumental concepts and algorithmics that advance the CyTOF® line of products. He also and played a fundamental role in the development of the MaxPar line of metal-labeling reagents until his retirement in 2019.

== Education ==
- M.Sc. at Moscow State University
- PhD in physical chemistry at Moscow State University - 1987

== Career ==
- Assistant to the chair of physical chemistry at Moscow State University.
- Research associate at York University
- Senior scientist at MDS SCIEX
- Associate professor at UofT in IBBME (2005–2008) and chemistry (2008–2011).
- Adjunct professor at York University.
- Principal scientist at DVS Sciences - 2005–2019
  (acquired by Fluidigm in 2014 and then Standard BioTools in 2022)

== Research ==
- Quadrupole theory (stability, acceptance and transmission of multipole RF and electrostatic driven devises), molecular gas dynamics, and supersonic beam expansion into vacuum.
- Development of the DRC Collision/reaction cell.
- Development of mass spectrometry (CyTOF), including fundamentals of operation and design of different MS instrumentation.

== Awards and honors ==
- 2019 HUPO Award (Human Proteome Organization)
- 2004 Elsevier / Spectrochimica Acta Atomic Spectroscopy Award for the most important paper published in Spectrochimica Acta Part B in 2002 (Title: Reaction cells and collision cells for ICP-MS: a tutorial review) in co-authorship with Scott D. Tanner and Dmitry Bandura
- 2001 Manning Innovation Award, Award of Distinction Dr. Vladimir Baranov, together with Scott D. Tanner, received the Manning Award of Distinction from the Manning Innovation Awards Foundation for the remarkable invention of the ICP-MS Dynamic Reaction Cell (Collision/reaction cell).
- 1999 Pittcon Editors' Awards Perkin-Elmer Sciex for their ELAN 6100 DRC (Dynamic Reaction Cell) ICP-MS system.

== Publications ==
- Feb 2017 - Imaging Mass Cytometry.
- Sept 2010 - Highly Multiparametric Analysis by Mass Cytometry.
- July 2009 - Mass Cytometry: Technique for Real Time Single Cell Multitarget Immunoassay based on Inductively Coupled Plasma Time-Of-Flight Mass Spectrometry
- Aug 2007 - Polymer‐Based Elemental Tags for Sensitive Bioassays.
- Sept 2002 - Reaction Cells and Collision Cells for ICP-MS: a tutorial review.
- May 2002 - A Sensitive and Quantitative Element-Tagged Immunoassay with ICPMS Detection.
- Feb 2002 - Detection of Ultratrace Phosphorus and Sulfur by Quadrupole ICPMS with Dynamic Reaction Cell.
- July 2001 - Reaction Chemistry and Collisional Processes in Multipole Devices for Resolving Isobaric Interferences in ICP–MS.
- Jan 2000 - A Dynamic Reaction Cell for Inductively Coupled Plasma Mass Spectrometry (ICP-DRC-MS). Part III. Optimization and Analytical Performance.
- Nov 1999 - A Dynamic Reaction Cell for Inductively Coupled Plasma Mass Spectrometry (ICP-DRC-MS). Part II. Reduction of Interferences Produced within the Cell.
- March 1999 - Theory, Design, and Operation of a Dynamic Reaction Cell for ICP-MS.
- Feb 1997 - Activation of Hydrogen and Methane by Thermalized FeO+ in the Gas Phase as Studied by Multiple Mass Spectrometric Techniques.

A more complete listing of his publications can be found on Google Scholar
