= List of people from St. Catharines =

The following people were born in, residents of, or are otherwise closely connected to the city of St. Catharines, Ontario:

== Fashion ==
- Supermodel Linda Evangelista was born and raised in St. Catharines. Her family still lives there. The breast screening centre at St. Catharines General Hospital is named after her and singer Bryan Adams.

== Art ==
- Edward Burtynsky, photographer
- Ralston Crawford, was a painter, printmaker, and photographer
- Marie Elyse St. George (born 1929), artist, poet
- David Rokeby, videographer spent his formative years in St. Catharines. His father was the Minister at St. Columba Anglican Church

== Film, television, and media ==
- R.J. Adams, (aka Bob Shannon) actor & radio personality, born in St. Catharines, attended Edith Cavell Elementary School, Disc Jockey WKBW Buffalo, KHJ, KFI Los Angeles, Rocky IV, NYPD Blue, Murder She Wrote and dozens of others.
- Mike Beaver, actor/writer, was born in St. Catharines. He has appeared in numerous films and TV shows such as He's Just Not That into You (film), Billable Hours, Sorority Boys, NCIS, It's Always Sunny in Philadelphia, Modern Family, Rizzoli & Isles, Coopers' Christmas, The In-Laws and Queer As Folk. Including writing for TBS's The Detour (TV series).
- Jason Cadieux, actor, genie nominated "Lilies", "Iron Eagle IV", founder Essential Collective Theatre
- Rick Campanelli, (aka "Rick the Temp"), former MuchMusic VJ and current reporter on ET Canada, attended Brock University
- Richard Carlyle (1914-2009), actor, Torpedo Run, Star Trek
- Hume Cronyn, late actor and husband of late actress Jessica Tandy, attended Ridley College, which is located within the city
- Jennifer Hollett, former MuchMusic VJ and videographer
- Paul Kennedy, former host of Ideas on CBC Radio One.
- Mark Montefiore, film and television producer
- Anthony Natale, Canadian - American actor
- Anna Olson, pastry chef and host of Food Network Canada's Sugar and Kitchen Equipped operated a bakery in Port Dalhousie until April 2009.
- Garry Robbins, starred as Saw-Tooth in the 2003 horror movie, Wrong Turn and was the Mud Monster from the Goosebumps book, You Can't Scare Me!
- Matthew Santoro, YouTube personality, lived in St. Catharines
- Bernard Slade, playwright and screenwriter, born in St. Catharines, was a head writer for Bewitched on ABC, developed the Flying Nun, and created the Partridge Family
- David Sutcliffe, actor
- Dave Thomas, actor/comedian, a former cast member of SCTV. Played the role of pharmacist Russell Norton on TV series Grace Under Fire. Also known for playing Doug of Bob & Doug McKenzie fame.
- John Zaritsky, documentary film maker
- Lauren Riihimaki, YouTube personality, known as LaurDIY
- Robin Duke, writer/actor
- Imane Anys, Youtube personality known as Pokimane

== Journalists ==
- Peter Gzowski, Canadian broadcaster, reporter and writer attended Ridley College
- Laura Sabia, Canadian social activist and feminist, spent a significant amount of time in St. Catharines and served on St. Catharines City Council
- Roger Smith, veteran Ottawa correspondent for the CTV national news broadcast

== Business ==
- Michael Sabia, CEO of Bell Canada and Bell Canada Enterprises and the son of Laura Sabia, was born and raised in St. Catharines. Angelee Brown, , the first female founder of a franchise consulting firm in Canada. Previous employment history includes Manager of Franchising Canada for Tim Hortons and Little Caesars; one of Canada's leading experts in Franchising; board member of CFLC (Canadian Forces Liaison Council) and advocate for women in Franchising and business was raised and resides in St. Catharines.
- Mike Thorn, founder of JustJunk.

== Musicians ==
- Most of the members of Alexisonfire hail from St. Catharines including Wade MacNeil, Chris Steele, Jesse Ingelevics and Dallas Green. City and Colour's music video for Save Your Scissors was filmed in St. Catharines inside L3 nightclub, a scene shot in the Pizza Pizza on St. Paul St and a scene in Ostanek's Music Shop.
- John Crossingham, Juno Award-winning drummer for Broken Social Scene, is a native of St. Catharines and continues to spend a significant amount of the time in the city when not touring with the band.
- Two members of the band Our Lady Peace - Raine Maida, lead singer, and Duncan Coutts, bass guitarist - both studied at Ridley College. Duncan was born and raised in St. Catharines and his family still lives there.
- Walter Ostanek, Grammy Award-winning musician and Canada's Polka King, is a St. Catharines resident. His store, Walter Ostanek's Music Centre, was located on Geneva Street in the city's downtown area. It opened in the late 1960s and closed on May 31, 2013.
- Neil Peart, drummer and lyricist of Rush, was raised in St. Catharines. The song "Lakeside Park" is based on the area of Port Dalhousie where he lived.
- Ron Sexsmith, Juno Award-winning singer/songwriter, was also born and raised here, and now lives in Perth County, Ontario.
- The Trews, spent a significant time in St. Catharines, before recently re-locating to nearby Niagara Falls.
- Matt Thiessen, lead singer and songwriter for the Christian rock band, Relient K, was born in St. Catharines before moving to Canton, Ohio.
- Ronn Metcalfe, club owner of the Castle, hosted many great bands of the mid 60's, Ronn was known as the 'king' of The Castle, Leader of "The Ronn Metcalfe Orchestra" which had moderate success and a single called "Twistin' at the Woodchopper's Ball". It charted in both the States and Canada. It was the first all Canadian song to top international charts.
- Tim Hicks, country music singer-songwriter born and raised in St. Catharines
- Laura de Turczynowicz, née Laura Christine Blackwell, (1878-1953), opera singer born and raised in St. Catharines
- James Bryan McCollum, guitarist of The Philosopher Kings and Prozzak, was raised in St. Catharines.
- [Gary Borden] (guitarist/musician)
- Sammy Jackson, jazz singer

== Novelists ==
- Richard B. Wright, resided in St. Catharines. Wright won the Giller Prize, the Trillium Book Award and the Governor General's Award in 2001 for his novel Clara Callan.

== Politicians ==
- Delos White Beadle (1823-1905), city councillor, horticulturist, and journalist
- Stuart Garson, former Premier of Manitoba (1943–48), Minister of Justice and Attorney General in Louis St. Laurent's cabinet (1948–57).
- Robert Stanley Kemp "Bob" Welch, former Deputy Premier of Ontario (1977–1985), served several cabinet postings under Premiers John Robarts, Bill Davis and Frank Miller, was a lifelong St. Catharines resident. He retired from politics to live in Niagara-on-the-Lake and practice law in St. Catharines.

== Scientists ==
- Scott D. Tanner is a scientist - co-inventor of Mass cytometry and the Collision/reaction cell

== Sports ==
- Mohammed Ahmed, long-distance runner and three-time Olympian
- Sara Bauer, women's hockey player for the NCAA Division I Wisconsin Badgers, won the 2006 Patty Kazmaier Award as the top women's college hockey player in the United States
- Steve Bauer, Olympic silver medalist and one of only two Canadians to wear the Tour de France Yellow jersey
- Brian Bellows, professional ice hockey player for the Minnesota North Stars and Montreal Canadiens
- William J Bruce III, author, publicist, and ministerial agent to Ted DiBiase
- Gerry Cheevers, NHL goaltender with the Toronto Maple Leafs and the Boston Bruins, inducted into the Hockey Hall of Fame in 1985
- Craig Conn, professional lacrosse player for the Calgary Roughnecks
- Ronnie Arnell, professional wrestler better known by his ring name Tye Dillinger
- Richard Duncan, Olympic long jumper and eight-time NCAA All-American
- Alan Eagleson, controversial hockey agent and promoter, also a lawyer and politician
- Marv Edwards, ice hockey goaltender
- Doug Favell, NHL goaltender with the Toronto Maple Leafs and Philadelphia Flyers
- Jeffrey Finley, professional football player for the Montreal Alouettes
- Sean Greenhalgh, professional lacrosse player for the Buffalo Bandits
- Rick Jeanneret, television and radio play-by-play announcer of the Buffalo Sabres
- Mark Johnston, swimmer who competed in the 2000 and 2004 Summer Olympics
- Abu Kigab, NCAA college basketball player for the Oregon Ducks men's basketball
- Melanie Kok, rower who won a bronze medal at the 2008 Summer Olympics
- Daultan Leveille, centre drafted 28th overall by the Atlanta Thrashers
- Ian Llord, professional lacrosse player for the Buffalo Bandits
- Keith Makubuya, professional soccer player for the Toronto FC
- Bryan McCabe, ice hockey defenceman for the New York Rangers
- Pat McCready, professional lacrosse player for the Toronto Rock
- Stan Mikita, member of the Hockey Hall of Fame, Hart Trophy (MVP) winner, Art Ross Trophy winner, captain of the Chicago Black Hawks, and member of Team Canada
- Kevin Neufeld, rower and member of the Canadian men's eights team that won the gold medal at the 1984 Summer Olympics
- Kirsten Moore-Towers, Olympic pairs figure skater
- Andrew Peters, left winger with the Buffalo Sabres of the National Hockey League
- Michael Ponikvar, Olympics high jumper, holds the Canadian High School high jump record
- Hector Pothier, professional football player for the Edmonton Eskimos
- Dick Pound, International Olympic Committee vice-president and chairman of the World Anti-Doping Agency
- Riley Sheahan, centre drafted 21st overall by the Detroit Red Wings
- Corey Small, professional lacrosse player for the Edmonton Rush
- Billy Dee Smith, professional lacrosse player for the Buffalo Bandits
- Rod Spittle, Champions Tour golfer
- Mark Steenhuis, professional lacrosse player for the Buffalo Bandits
- Conor Timmins, ice hockey player for the Toronto Maple Leafs
- Steve Toll, former professional lacrosse player
- Elmer "Moose" Vasko, ice hockey defenceman for the Chicago Black Hawks
- Matt Vinc, professional lacrosse goaltender for the Buffalo Bandits
- Buffy-Lynne Williams, Canadian rower who won the bronze medal at the 2000 Summer Olympics in the Women's Eight event
- Alexa Vasko (born 1999), professional ice hockey forward for the Ottawa Charge

== War heroes ==
- Sir Frederick Benson, British Army general
- Frederick Fisher, St. Catharines-born recipient of the Victoria Cross for actions during the Second Battle of Ypres in the First World War
- Air Commodore Leonard Birchall, St. Catharines-born Royal Canadian Air Force pilot during Second World War.
- Harriet Tubman, Underground Railroad conductor and American Civil War veteran. -->

== Criminals ==
- Karla Homolka, female serial rapist and killer who participated in the murders of Leslie Mahaffy and Kristen French in 1991 and 1992 alongside her husband Paul Bernardo. The crimes committed by Homolka and Bernardo, which also included the rape leading to the death of Homolka's sister Tammy in 1990, received extensive media coverage in Canada and foreign media such as the United States throughout the 1990s.

== Other ==
- Sarah Josephine Meredith Langstaff, founder of the Daughters of the British Empire
