= Scott D. Tanner =

Canadian scientist

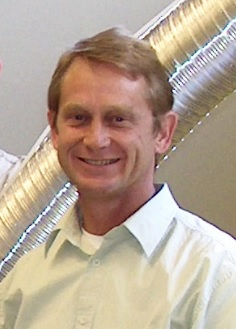
Scott D. Tanner Scientist

Scott Tanner is a Canadian scientist, inventor, and entrepreneur. His areas of expertise include mass spectroscopy, especially inductively coupled plasma mass spectrometry (ICP-MS), and mass cytometry.

Tanner is best known for his work on the fundamentals of inductively coupled plasma mass spectrometry, for the invention of mass cytometry, and co-founding (with Dmitry Bandura, Vladimir Baranov and Olga Ornatsky) DVS Sciences in 2004,(acquired by Fluidigm in 2014 and then renamed to Standard BioTools in 2022) the company that first commercialized the instrument and reagents of mass cytometry.

== Early life and education ==
Tanner was born and raised in St. Catharines, Ontario Canada. He bought his first chemistry set, from his brother, at age 6. Through his early teenage years, he was provided with laboratory space at Brock University, under the guidance of Dr. E.A. Cherniak and Dr. F.P. Koffyberg, where he attempted to replicate Geiger–Marsden experiments also known as Rutherford's experiment (scattering of alpha particles by gold foil) using various home-built instruments, including cloud chambers.

Tanner graduated with a BSc in chemistry from York University in 1976. During his undergraduate years, he became a nationally ranked gymnast. An injury at the Olympic trials ended his competitive gymnastics career, and he took up marathon running during graduate school (best time 2:47:13). He received a Doctor of Philosophy (Chemistry) from York University in 1980, having studied ion-molecule reaction kinetics and flame ion chemistry with Drs. D.K Bohme and J.M. Goodings.

== Biography ==
Tanner joined SCIEX, which later became MDS SCIEX, in 1980 as a research scientist. He became principal scientist in 2000. In his 25 years at SCIEX, Tanner developed and helped to commercialize a string of mass spectrometry products.

Tanner published over 74 peer-reviewed scientific articles, and holds 22 US patents (with corresponding filings in other countries), including 13 patents on Mass Cytometry technology

Tanner was a co-founder of DVS Sciences and, as the president and CEO, saw the company through the development and commercial launch of its first products.

The products that DVS Sciences brought to the global market were originally developed at the University of Toronto where Tanner was a professor in the Institute of Biomaterials and Biomedical Engineering and then in chemistry.

== Career ==
- Principal Scientist SCIEX - 1980-2005
- Associate Professor (CLTA) at the University of Toronto, first in the Institute of Biomaterials and Biomedical Engineering (2005–2008) and then in Chemistry 2008–2013.
- President DVS Sciences 2004 - 2015
  (acquired by Fluidigm in 2014)
- Adjunct Professor at York University in the Department of Chemistry 2015–2018

== Volunteer Work ==
Chair of the Three Churches Heritage Foundation in Mahone Bay - 2020–Present

== Books ==
- 2003 - Plasma Source Mass Spectrometry: Applications and Emerging Technologies ISBN 0854046038
- 2001 - Plasma Source Mass Spectrometry: The New Millennium ISBN 0854048952
- 1999 - Plasma Source Mass Spectrometry: New Developments and Applications ISBN 0854047492
- 1997 - Plasma Source Mass Spectrometry: Developments and Applications ISBN 0854047271

== Research ==
- Detection of TCDD (dioxin) in soil and water, explosives, chemical agents.
- Development of the ELAN 6000 ICP-MS
- Development of the DRC Collision/reaction cell
- Development of Mass cytometry see also CyTOF

== Awards and honors ==
- 2024 York U Alumni Award for Outstanding Achievement
- 2020 Lifetime Achievement Award in Plasma Spectrochemistry
- 2019 HUPO Award (Human Proteome Organization)
- 2014 Fellow of the American Institute for Medical and Biological Engineering
- 2011 University of Toronto Inventor of the Year Award for Biomedical and Life Sciences
- 2011 Thermo Fisher Scientific Spectroscopy Award
- 2004 Elsevier / Spectrochimica Acta Atomic Spectroscopy Award for the most important paper published in Spectrochimica Acta Part B in 2002 (Title: Reaction cells and collision cells for ICP-MS: a tutorial review) in co-authorship with Dmitry Bandura and Vladimir Baranov
- 2003 W.A.E. McBryde medal from the Canadian Chemical Society of the Chemical Institute of Canada
- 2001 Manning Innovation Award, Award of Distinction Dr. Scott Tanner, together with Dr. Vladimir Baranov, received the Manning Award of Distinction from the Manning Innovation Awards Foundation for the remarkable invention of the ICP-MS Dynamic Reaction Cell (Collision/reaction cell).
- 1999 Pittcon Editors' Awards Perkin-Elmer Sciex for their ELAN 6100 DRC (Dynamic Reaction Cell) ICP-MS system.
- Fellow of the Royal Society of Chemistry (UK)
- Fellow of the American Institute for Medical and Biological Engineering (AIMBE)

== Publications ==
Scott has published more than 75 peer-reviewed articles.
The 13 most cited (more than 200 citations each) include:

- May 2011 - Single-Cell Mass Cytometry of Differential Immune and Drug Responses Across a Human Hematopoietic Continuum )
- Sept 2010 - Highly Multiparametric Analysis by Mass Cytometry
- Aug 2009 - Mass Cytometry: Technique for Real Time Single Cell Multitarget Immunoassay Based on Inductively Coupled Plasma Time-Of-Flight Mass Spectrometry
- Sept 2002 - Reaction Cells and Collision Cells for ICP-MS: A Tutorial Review
- April 2002 - A Sensitive and Quantitative Element-Tagged Immunoassay with ICPMS Detection
- April 2002 - Detection of Ultratrace Phosphorus and Sulfur by Quadrupole ICPMS with Dynamic Reaction Cell
- July 2001 - Reaction Chemistry and Collisional Processes in Multipole Devices for Resolving Isobaric Interferences in ICP–MS
- Aug 2000 - A Dynamic Reaction Cell for Inductively Coupled Plasma Mass Spectrometry (ICP-DRC-MS). Part III.
- Nov 1999 - A Dynamic Reaction Cell for Inductively Coupled Plasma Mass Spectrometry (ICP-DRC-MS). Part II. Reduction of Interferences Produced within the Cell
- March 1999 - Theory, Design, and Operation of a Dynamic Reaction Cell for ICP-MS
- Jan 1995 - Characterization of Ionization and Matrix Suppression in Inductively Coupled ‘Cold’ Plasma Mass Spectrometry
- June 1992 - Space Charge in ICP-MS: Calculation and Implications
- July 1988 - Nonspectroscopic Interelement Interferences in Inductively Coupled Plasma Mass Spectrometry

A more complete listing of his publications can be found on Google Scholar
