= Dmitry Bandura =

Canadian scientist

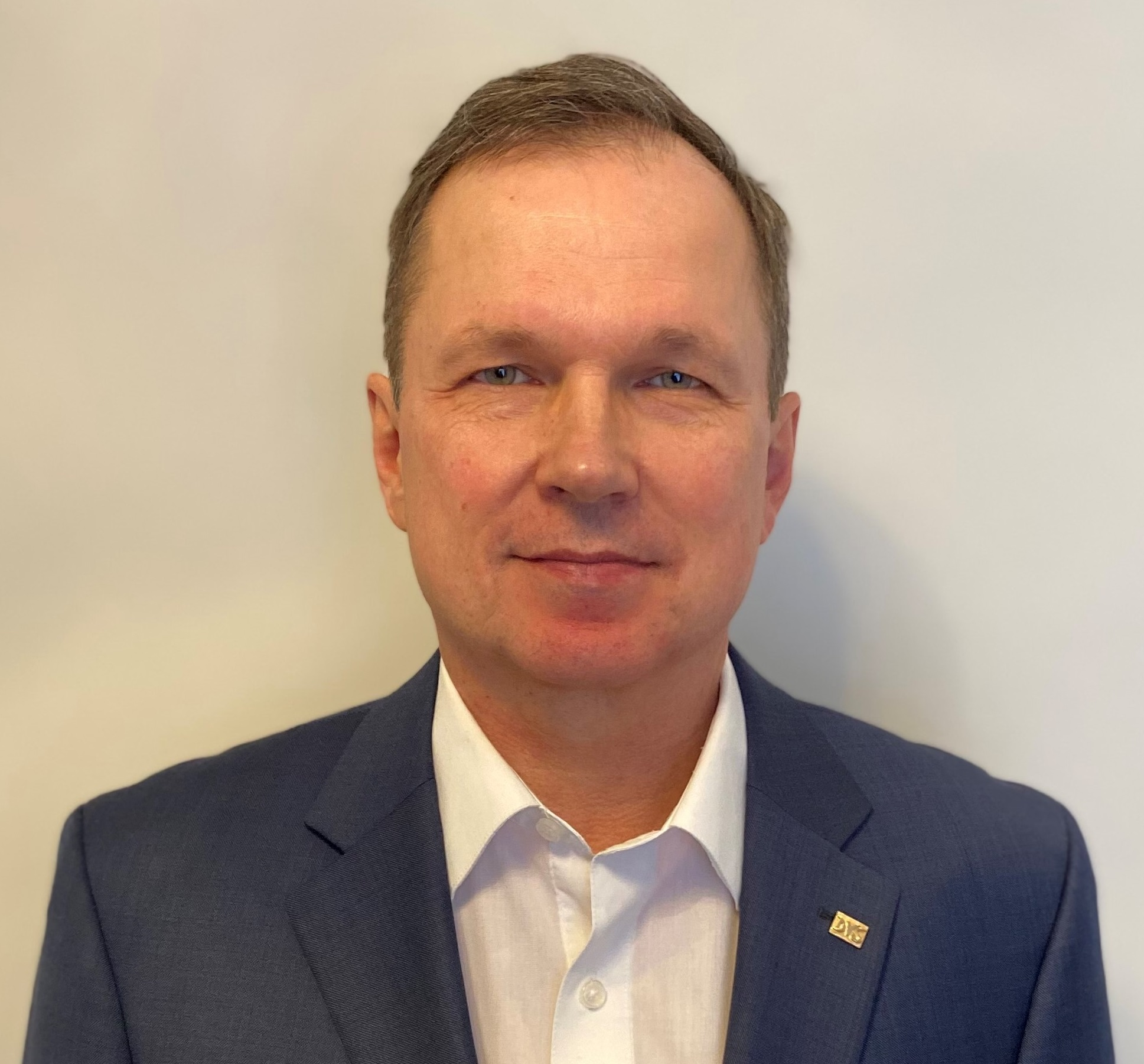
Dmitry Bandura Scientist

Dmitry Bandura is a Soviet-born Canadian scientist, notable for being one of the co-inventors of the Mass cytometry technology. Bandura co-founded DVS Sciences in 2004 (acquired by Fluidigm in 2014 and then renamed to Standard BioTools in 2022) along with Drs Vladimir Baranov, Scott D. Tanner, and Olga Ornatsky.

== Biography ==
Bandura grew up in Chernivtsi, Ukraine, where he graduated from school #35 with distinction. He received an MSc in engineering physics in 1985 and a PhD in technical sciences, both supervised by Professor Alexander A. Sysoev at Moscow Engineering Physics Institute. His PhD thesis research focused on elemental analysis of hypervelocity microparticles via time-of-flight mass spectrometry (TOF-MS) of their impact-induced plasma.

Bandura emigrated to Australia in 1992, where he worked as a Research Physicist at GBC Scientific Equipment. There, he worked on the development of inductively coupled plasma mass spectrometry (ICP-MS), contributing to the release of the award-winning Optimass 8000 ICP-TOF-MS in 1998. Bandura then relocated to Toronto, Canada, where he joined MDS SCIEX (now Sciex) to continue working on the development of new ICP-MS instrumentation methods, particularly in the area of collision and reaction cells.

In 2005, together with Scott D. Tanner and Vladimir Baranov, Bandura began independently developing an ICP-TOF-MS based cytometer and became a researcher at the University of Toronto in March 2005. After securing ample funding by 2010 from various sources, including National Institutes of Health, Ontario Institute for Cancer Research (OICR), the Ministry of Research and Innovation, Ontario Centres of Excellence, Health Technology Exchange, and Genome Canada via the Ontario Genomics Institute, and venture capital from 5 AM Ventures, Bandura and the DVS Sciences team successfully commercialized their technology, leading to the acquisition of DVS Sciences by Fluidigm in 2014

Bandura headed R&D and Canadian operations at Fluidigm Canada following the merger and Standard BioTools Canada (formerly DVS Sciences) following a capital infusion in 2022, stewarding the development of the next generation of mass cytometry and imaging mass cytometry instruments and reagents.

== Awards and honors ==
- 2019 HUPO Award (Human Proteome Organization) for “development of a unique high-parameter mass cytometry technology that brings unprecedented understanding of single cell proteomics”, together with the co-inventors Scott D. Tanner, Vladimir Baranov and Olga Ornatsky.
- The Analytical Scientist Innovation Award 2017: #1 New Product of 2017 for the Fluidigm Hyperion Imaging System, as a leader of the development team
- 2004 Elsevier / Spectrochimica Acta Atomic Spectroscopy Award for the most important paper published in Spectrochimica Acta Part B in 2002 (Title: Reaction cells and collision cells for ICP-MS: a tutorial review) in co-authorship with Scott D. Tanner and Vladimir Baranov
- 1998 R&D World 100 Winners in Analytical instrumentation for the GBC Optimass 8000
- Fellow of the Royal Society of Chemistry (UK)

== Publications ==
- Sept 2010 - Highly Multiparametric Analysis by Mass Cytometry
- Aug 2009 - Mass Cytometry: Technique for Real Time Single Cell Multitarget Immunoassay Based on Inductively Coupled Plasma Time-Of-Flight Mass Spectrometry (1148 citations as of January 28, 2023)
- Sept 2002 - Reaction Cells and Collision Cells for ICP-MS: A Tutorial Review
- Feb 2002 - A Sensitive and Quantitative Element-Tagged Immunoassay with ICPMS Detection
- Feb 2002 - Detection of Ultratrace Phosphorus and Sulfur by Quadrupole ICPMS with Dynamic Reaction Cell
- July 2001 - Reaction Chemistry and Collisional Processes in Multipole Ddevices for Resolving Isobaric Interferences in ICP–MS

A more complete listing of his publications can be found on Google scholar

== Book ==
- Holland, J. Grenville; Bandura, Dmitry R., eds. (11 November 2005). Plasma Source Mass Spectrometry. Cambridge: Royal Society of Chemistry. doi:10.1039/9781847552419. ISBN 978-0899305936.
