= Olga Ornatsky =

Canadian Scientist

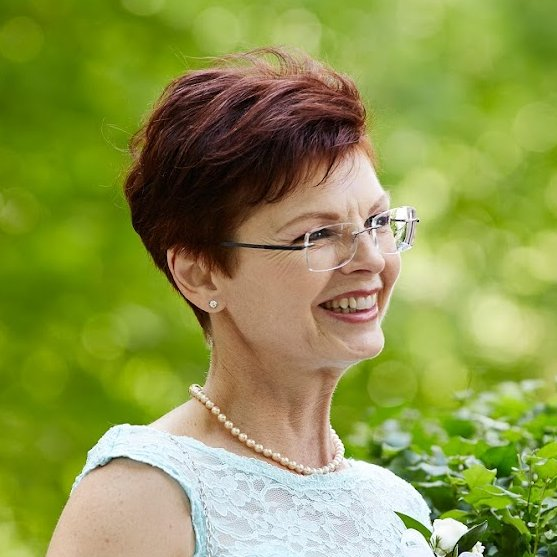
Olga Ornatsky Scientist

Olga Ornatsky is a Soviet born, Canadian scientist. Ornatsky co-founded DVS Sciences in 2004 (acquired by Fluidigm in 2014 and then renamed to Standard BioTools in 2022) along with Dmitry Bandura, Vladimir Baranov and Scott D. Tanner.

== Biography ==
Ornatsky graduated from the Moscow State University, Department of Biology. In 1989, she completed her Ph.D. in cell and molecular biology, and worked as a research scientist at the Cardiology Centre studying vascular smooth muscle involvement in atherosclerosis. In 1993, she immigrated to Canada, and became a postdoctoral research fellow at York University. She quickly progressed to become senior research associate in the Laboratory of Vascular Biology and Cardiac Surgery at St. Michael's Hospital (Toronto). Her achievements brought her to MDS Proteomics Inc. (now Protana Inc), where she led her research group as a senior scientist for four years.

In 2005, she left MDS to pursue a different direction. Together with the co-founders of DVS Sciences Inc. Scott D. Tanner, Vladimir Baranov and Dmitry Bandura, she helped develop the CyTOF™ Mass Cytometer, for highly multi-parametric single cell analysis at the Department of Chemistry, University of Toronto. Olga held the position of director of Bioassay Development at DVS Sciences, Inc. After the merger with Fluidigm Inc in 2014, she transitioned to principal scientist, Proteomics division, and led a group of biology and chemistry researchers involved in developing new metal-tagged affinity reagents, as well as methods and applications for Mass cytometry until her retirement in 2019.

== Education ==
- M.Sc. in biology Moscow State University
- Ph.D. in cell and molecular biology Moscow State University- In 1989

== Career ==
- Research scientist in cardiology at Moscow State University
- Postdoctoral research fellow at York University - 1993
- Senior research associate, Laboratory of Vascular Biology and Cardiac Surgery at St. Michael's Hospital (Toronto)
- Senior scientist MDS Proteomics, Inc. - 2001- 2005
- Research associate, Institute of Biomaterials and Biomedical Engineering (IBBME), University of Toronto
- Principal scientist, biology DVS Sciences - 2005 - 2019
  (acquired by Fluidigm in 2014 and then Standard BioTools in 2022)

== Research ==
Ornatsky has more than fifteen years of experience in the commercial environment as a senior strategic product application developer and in providing advanced customer/collaborator support. Her primary field of expertise is in cellular and molecular biology, with the objective of developing bioanalytical assays for mass cytometry(CyTOF). Olga is a principal inventor on several patents.

== Awards and honors ==
- 2019 HUPO Award (Human Proteome Organization)

== Publications ==
- Mar 2021 Establishing CD19 B-cell reference control materials for comparable and quantitative cytometric expression analysis
- April 2020 Enabling Indium Channels for Mass Cytometry by Using Reinforced Cyclambased Chelating Polylysine
- April 2020 Tantalum Oxide Nanoparticle-Based Mass Tag for Mass Cytometry
- Dec 2019 Tumor Platinum Concentrations and Pathological Responses Following Cisplatin-Containing Chemotherapy in Gastric Cancer Patients
- Dec 2019 Skin platinum deposition in colorectal cancer patients following oxaliplatin-based therapy
- Nov 2019 Automated Data Cleanup for Mass Cytometry
- Aug 2019 A Metal-Chelating Polymer for Chelating Zirconium and its Use in Mass Cytometry
- June 2019 Multidimensional profiling of drug-treated cells by Imaging Mass Cytometry
- July 2019 Human lymphoid organ cDC2 and macrophages play complementary roles in T follicular helper responses
- Feb 2019 Multidimensional Profiling of Drug-Treated Cells by Imaging Mass Cytometry
- July 2019 Human lymphoid organ cDC2 and macrophages play complementary roles in T follicular helper responses
- Jan 2019 Lanthanide nanoparticles for high sensitivity multiparameter single cell analysis
- Mar 2018 Aptamer-facilitated mass cytometry
- Feb 2018 Tumor platinum concentrations and pathological responses following preoperative cisplatin-containing chemotherapy in gastric or gastroesophageal junction cancer patients.
- Feb 2018 Platinum deposition in skin as a possible mechanism for peripheral sensory neuropathy (PSN) in patients (pts) with colorectal cancer (CRC) following oxaliplatin-based therapy.
- Nov 2017 Simultaneous Detection of Protein and mRNA in Jurkat and KG‐1a Cells by Mass Cytometry
- July 2017 Abstract 2104: In vitro drug effects on cancer cell morphology and functional state revealed by multiparameter imaging mass cytometry
- June 2017 Liposome-Encapsulated NaLnF 4 Nanoparticles for Mass Cytometry: Evaluating Nonspecific Binding to Cells
- Aug 2014 Metal-chelating polymers developed for mass cytometry as a potential route to high activity radioimmunotherapeutic agents
- July 2014 Single cell measurement of the uptake, intratumoral distribution, and cell cycle effects of cisplatin using mass cytometry
- Nov 2013 Dual-Purpose Polymer Labels Majonis Biomacromolecules 2013
- May 2013 The Means: Cytometry and Mass Spectrometry Converge in a Single Cell Deep Profiling Platform
- April 2013 Dual-Purpose Polymer Labels for Fluorescent and Mass Cytometric Affinity Bioassays
- April 2013 An introduction to mass cytometry: Fundamentals and applications
- July 2012 Metal-Chelating Polymers by Anionic Ring-Opening Polymerization and Their Use in Quantitative Mass Cytometry
- July 2012 Human CD4+ lymphocytes for antigen quantification: Characterization using conventional flow cytometry and mass cytometry
- Nov 2011 MASSIVELY MULTIPARAMETER SINGLE CELL ANALYSIS BY MASS CYTOMETRY
- Sept 2011 Curious Results with Palladium- and Platinum-Carrying Polymers in Mass Cytometry Bioassays and an Unexpected Application as a Dead Cell Stain
- Aug 2011 Development of mass cytometry methods for bacterial discrimination
- June 2011 Surface Functionalization Methods To Enhance Bioconjugation in Metal-Labeled Polystyrene Particles
- June 2011 Surface Functionalization Methods To Enhance Bioconjugation in Metal-Labeled Polystyrene Particles
- May 2011 Single-Cell Mass Cytometry of Differential Immune and Drug Responses Across a Human Hematopoietic Continuum
- Jan 2011 Multiplexed protease assays using element-tagged substrates
- Oct 2010 Synthesis of a Functional Metal-Chelating Polymer and Steps toward Quantitative Mass Cytometry Bioassays
- Sept 2010 Highly multiparametric analysis by mass cytometry
- Aug 2010 A Distinctive DNA Damage Response in Human Hematopoietic Stem Cells Reveals an Apoptosis-Independent Role for p53 in Self-Renewal
- June 2010 Hybrid nanogels by encapsulation of lanthanide-doped LaF3 nanoparticles as elemental tags for detection by atomic mass spectrometry
- Feb 2010 Metal-Containing Polystyrene Beads as Standards for Mass Cytometry
- Feb 2010 Bio-Functional, Lanthanide-Labeled Polymer Particles by Seeded Emulsion Polymerization and their Characterization by Novel ICP-MS Detection
- Feb 2010 Lanthanide-Containing Polymer Microspheres by Multiple-Stage Dispersion Polymerization for Highly Multiplexed Bioassays
- Nov 2009 Development of inductively coupled plasma-mass spectrometry-based protease assays
- July 2009 Mass Cytometry: Technique for Real Time Single Cell Multitarget Immunoassay Based on Inductively Coupled Plasma Time-of-Flight Mass Spectrometry
- Mar 2009 The influence of PEG macromonomers on the size and properties of thermosensitive aqueous microgels
- Feb 2009 ICP-MS-Based Multiplex Profiling of Glycoproteins Using Lectins Conjugated to Lanthanide-Chelating Polymers
- Dec 2008 Flow cytometer with mass spectrometer detection for massively multiplexed single-cell biomarker assay
- Dec 2008 Biocompatible Hybrid Nanogels
- Aug 2008 Element-tagged immunoassay with ICP-MS detection: Evaluation and comparison to conventional immunoassays
- May 2008 Study of Cell Antigens and Intracellular DNA by Identification of Element-Containing Labels and Metallointercalators Using Inductively Coupled Plasma Mass Spectrometry
- Feb 2008 Development of analytical methods for multiplex bio-assay with inductively coupled plasma mass spectrometry
- Dec 2007 Lanthanide-Containing Polymer Nanoparticles for Biological Tagging Applications: Nonspecific Endocytosis and Cell Adhesion
- Aug 2007 Polymer-Based Elemental Tags for Sensitive Bioassays
- Mar 2007 Multiplex bio-assay with inductively coupled plasma mass spectrometry: Towards a massively multivariate single-cell technology
- Mar 2007 Large-scale mapping of human protein-protein interactions by mass spectrometry
- Sept 2006 Messenger RNA Detection in Leukemia Cell lines by Novel Metal-Tagged in situ Hybridization using Inductively Coupled Plasma Mass Spectrometry
- Feb 2006 Multiple cellular antigen detection by ICP-MS
- Jan 2006 Phosphoproteomics in Drug Discovery and Development
- Aug 2004 The Reproducible Acquisition of Comparative Liquid Chromatography/Tandem Mass Spectrometry Data from Complex Biological Samples
- Mar 2004 Differential Phosphoprofiles of EGF and EGFR Kinase Inhibitor-Treated Human Tumor Cells and Mouse Xenografts
- Jan 2004 Characterization of phosphorus content of biological samples by ICP-DRC-MS: Potential tool for cancer research
- Jan 2002 Administration of exogenous endothelin-1 following vascular balloon injury: early and late effects on intimal hyperplasia
- Jan 2001 Effects of Estrogen Replacement on Infarct Size, Cardiac Remodeling, and the Endothelin System After Myocardial Infarction in Ovariectomized Rats
- Aug 1999 Post-translational control of the MEF2A transcriptional regulatory protein
- Nov 1998 (MEF2) with a mitogen-activated protein kinase, ERK5/BMK1
- Jan 1998 A Dominant-Negative Form of Transcription Factor MEF2 Inhibits Myogenesis
- Aug 1997 Molecular cloning of up-regulated cytoskeletal genes from regenerating skeletal muscle: Potential role of myocyte enhancer factor 2 proteins in the activation of muscle-regeneration-associated genes
- Nov 1996 MEF2 Protein Expression, DNA Binding Specificity and Complex Composition, and Transcriptional Activity in Muscle and Non-muscle Cells
- Feb 1996 Dystrophin, vinculin, and aciculin in skeletal muscle subject to chronic use and disuse
- Nov 1995 Effects of hypothyroidism and aortic constriction on mitochondria during cardiac hypertrophy
- Nov 1995 Expression of stress proteins and mitochondrial chaperones in chronically stimulated skeletal muscle
- June 1995 Mitochondrial biogenesis during pressure overload induced cardiac hypertrophy in adult rats
- Mar 1989 Identification and immunolocalization of a new component of human cardiac muscle intercalated disc
- Jan 1989 Modulation of human aorta smooth muscle cell phenotype: A study of muscle-specific variants of vinculin, caldesmon, and actin expression
- Sept 1988 Immunolocalization of meta-vinculin in human smooth and cardiac muscles
- June 1988 Diversity of vinculin/meta-vinculin in human tissues and cultivated cells. Expression of muscle specific variants of vinculin in human aorta smooth muscle cells
- July 1987 Immunoreactive forms of caldesmon in cultivated human vascular smooth muscle cells
- Feb 1987 Identification of smooth muscle-derived foam cells in the atherosclerotic plaque of human aorta with monoclonal antibody IIG10
- Nov 1986 Metavinculin distribution in adult human tissues and cultuED cells
- April 1986 Red blood cell targeting to smooth muscle cells
- Oct 1985 Monoclonal antibodies that distinguish between human aorta smooth muscle and endothelial cells
- Systems immunology (WS-086) WS/PP-086-01 What is "Systems Immunology" for? WS/PP-086-02 Cholinergic stimulation modulates T cell-independent humoral immune responses in the spleenWS/PP-086-03 Next-generation 31-parameter flow cytometry reveals systems-level relationships in human bone marrow signaling and homeostasisWS/PP-086-04 Organization of the autoantibody repertoire in healthy newborns and adults revealed by system level informatics of antigen microarray dataWS/PP-086-05 Methods for develo
- Systems immunology (WS-086) WS/PP-086-01 What is âSystems Immunologyâ for? WS/PP-086-02 Cholinergic stimulation modulates T cell-independent humoral immune responses in the spleenWS/PP-086-03 Next-generation 31-parameter flow cytometry reveals systems-level relationships in human bone marrow signaling and homeostasisWS/PP-086-04 Organization of the autoantibody repertoire in healthy newborns and adults revealed by system level informatics of antigen microarray dataWS/PP-086-05 Methods for de
- Novel polymer-based elemental tags for sensitive bio-assays
