= Spectrochimica Acta =

Spectrochimica Acta may refer to:

- Spectrochimica Acta Part A
- Spectrochimica Acta Part B
