= Barry French =

Barry French may refer to:

- Barry French (American football)
- Barry French (scientist)
