= FlowJo =

Software package for analyzing flow cytometry data

- Developer: FlowJo LLC
- Release: 1996
- Stable release: v10.10 / 16 November 2023; 2 years ago
- License: Proprietary
- Website: www.flowjo.com/solutions/flowjo

FlowJo is a software package for analyzing flow cytometry data. Files produced by modern flow cytometers are written in the Flow Cytometry Standard format with an .fcs file extension. FlowJo will import and analyze cytometry data regardless of which flow cytometer is used to collect the data.

== Operation ==
In FlowJo, samples are organized in a "Workspace" window, which presents a hierarchical view of all the samples and their analyses (gates and statistics). Viewing an entire experiment in a Workspace permits organizing and managing complex cytometry experiments and produces detailed graphical reports. FlowJo's ability to automate repetitive operations facilitates the production of statistics tables and graphical reports when the experiment involves many samples, parameters and/or operations.

Within a workspace, samples can be grouped or sorted by various attributes such as the panel of antibodies with which they are stained, tissue type, or patient from whom they came. When an operation on a group is initiated, FlowJo can perform the same operation on every sample belonging to that group. Thus, you can apply a gate to a sample, copy it to the group, and that gate will be automatically placed on all samples in the group.

FlowJo provides tools for the creation of histogram and other plot overlays, cell cycle analysis, calcium flux analysis, proliferation analysis, quantification, cluster identification, and backgating display.

== Development ==
FlowJo became a commercial product in 1996. In 2002, Tree Star released a Windows version. FlowJo was acquired by Becton Dickinson in 2017.
