= William Breukelman =

Canadian engineer

William Breukelman, O.C., MBA, P.ENG, is the former principal and chairman of IMAX Corporation, and co-founder (with Barry French) and former CEO and chairman of SCIEX, whose technology the Office of the Governor General of Canada has described as "breakthrough", and Business Arts Inc., which funds startups.

He was appointed an Officer of the Order of Canada in 2013.

== Awards and honors ==
- Engineering Alumni Hall of Distinction Award: 2015, University of Toronto
