= CyTOF =

Mass cytometry application to quantify labeled cell targets

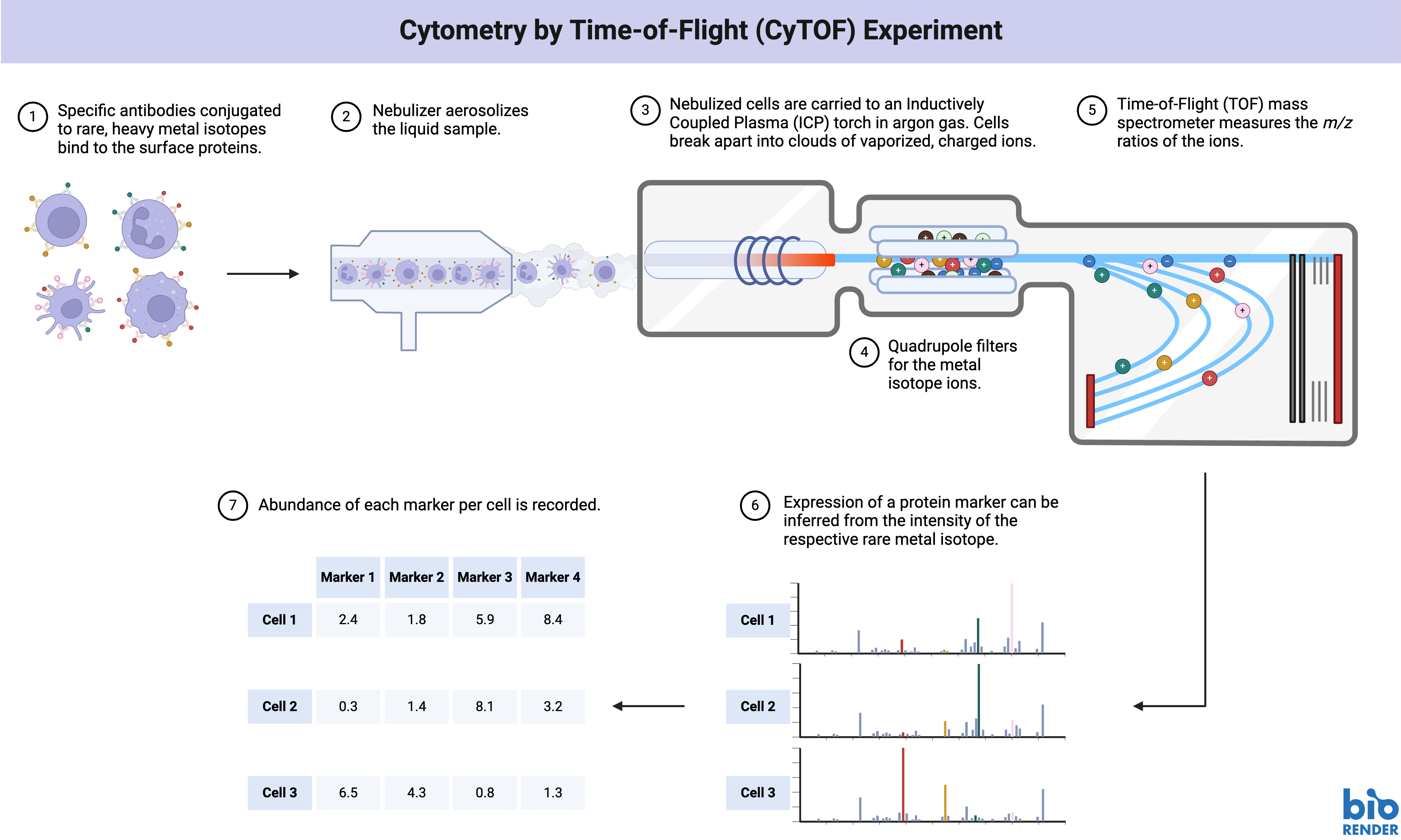
Figure 1: A visualization of a mass cytometry / Cytometry by time of flight (CyTOF) workflow. First, antibodies conjugated to rare, heavy metal isotopes bind to the cells. The nebulizer aerosolizes the liquid sample and passes it on to the ICP, the quadrupole, and the TOF mass spectrometer.

Cytometry by time of flight, or CyTOF, is an application of mass cytometry used to quantify labeled targets on the surface and interior of single cells. CyTOF allows the quantification of multiple cellular components simultaneously using an ICP-MS detector.

CyTOF takes advantage of immunolabeling to quantify proteins, carbohydrates or lipids in a cell. Targets are selected to answer a specific research question and are labeled with lanthanide metal tagged antibodies. Labeled cells are nebulized and mixed with heated argon gas to dry the cell containing particles. The sample-gas mixture is focused and ignited with an argon plasma torch. This breaks the cells into their individual atoms and creates an ion cloud. Abundant low weight ions generated from environmental air and biological molecules are removed using a quadrupole mass analyzer. The remaining heavy ions from the antibody tags are quantified by Time-of-flight mass spectrometry. Ion abundances correlate with the amount of target per cell and can be used to infer cellular qualities.

Mass spectrometry's sensitivity to detect different ions allows measurements of upwards of 50 targets per cell while avoiding issues with spectral overlap seen when using fluorescent probes. However, this sensitivity also means trace heavy metal contamination is a concern. Using large numbers of probes creates new problems in analyzing the high dimensional data generated.

== History ==
In 1994 Tsutomu Nomizu and colleagues at Nagoya University performed the first mass spectrometry experiments of single cells. Nomizu realized that single cells could be nebulized, dried, and ignited in plasma to generate clouds of ions which could be detected by emission spectrometry. In this type of experiment elements such as calcium within the cell could be quantified. Inspired by Flow cytometry, in 2007 Scott D. Tanner built upon this ICP-MS with the first multiplexed assay using lanthanide metals to label DNA and cell surface markers. In 2008 Tanner described the tandem attachment of a flow cytometer to an ICP-MS instrument as well as new antibody tags that would allow massively multiplexed analysis of cell markers. By further optimizing the detection speed and sensitivity of this flow coupled to ICP-MS they built the first CyTOF instrument.

The CyTOF instrument was originally owned by the Canadian company DVS Sciences but is now the exclusive product of Fluidigm after their acquisition in 2014 of DVS sciences. In 2022 Fluidigm received a capital infusion and changed its name to Standard BioTools. There have been 4 iterations of the CyTOF apparatus named CyTOF, CyTOF2, Helios™ and CyTOF XT. The successive improvements were largely in increased detection range and software parameters with the Helios instrument able to detect from metals ranging from yttrium-89 to bismuth-209 and throughput and analyze 2000 events per minute.

== Workflow ==
The Lanthanide group of elements are used for tagging antibodies, as the background in biological samples is very low. When choosing the appropriate isotope for the biomarker, low expression biomarkers should be paired with an isotope that has high signal intensity. If a less pure isotope must be used, it should be paired with a low expression biomarker, to minimize any non specific binding or background.

Isotope polymers are constructed using diethylenetriaminepentaacetic acid (DTPA) chelator to bind ions together. The polymer terminates with a thiol or a maleimide that links it to reduced disulfides in the Fc region of the antibody. Four to five polymers are bound to an antibody, resulting in about 100 isotope atoms per antibody. Tagged antibodies may be in solution, conjugated to beads, or surface immobilized. The cell staining follows the same procedures as in fluorescent staining for flow cytometry.

To distinguish between live and dead cells, cells can be probed with rhodium, an intercalator which can only penetrate dead cells. Then all cells are fixed and stained with iridium, which penetrates all cells, to be able to visualize which are alive.

The cell introduction method of the mass cytometer is an aerosol splitter injection. The cells are then captured in a stream of argon gas, then transported to the plasma where they are vaporized, atomized, and ionized. The cell is now a cloud of ions, which passes into the ion optics center. Then a time of flight analyzer is used to measure the mass of the ions.

== Data analysis ==
Ions are accelerated through the spectrometer in pulses. The electron cloud generated from a single cell is typically 10-150 pulses. The output of a Helios™ run is a binary integrated mass data (IMD) file that contains electron intensities measured from the ions for each mass channel. The continuous pulses must be resolved into individual cell events corresponding to the ion cloud generated from one cell. Each bin of between 10-150 pulses that passes the user set lower convolution threshold, is considered a cell event by the Helios™ software. The lower convolution threshold is the minimal ion count that must be reached across all ion channels to be considered a cell event. The value for this parameter increases with the number of ions being measured and thus more counts are required to define a cell event when more labels are used.

For data analysis, the IMD file is converted into the flow cytometry standard (FCS) format. This file contains the total ion counts for each channel for every cell arranged in a matrix and is the same file generated during flow cytometry. Manual gating of this data can be performed as is done for flow cytometry and most of the tools available for flow cytometry analysis have been ported to CyTOF (See flow cytometry bioinformatics). CyTOF data is typically high dimensional. To delineate relationships between cell populations dimensionality reduction algorithms are often used. Several multidimensional analysis clustering algorithms are common. Popular tools include tSNE, FlowSOM, and the diffusion pseudo time (DPT). The downstream analysis methods depend on the research goals.

== Applications ==
CyTOF provides important information at a single cell level about protein expression, immunophenotype, and functional characterization. It is a valuable tool in immunology, where the large number of parameters has helped to elucidate the workings of this complex system. For example, natural killer cells have diverse properties affected by numerous markers in various combinations, which could not be analyzed with ease prior to this technology. Simultaneously measuring many biomarkers makes it possible to identify over 30 distinct immunophenotype subsets within one complex group of cells. This can help to more fully characterize immune function, infectious disease, and cancers, and understand cells response to therapy.

== Advantages and disadvantages ==
The major advantage of CYTOF is the ability to investigate a larger number of parameters per panel than other cytometry methods. This allows a greater understanding of complex and heterogeneous cell populations, without the need for many complex and overlapping panels. Panels can include up to 45 antibodies, as opposed to the 10 that can be done in conventional flow cytometry but require great expertise to design. However, development of spectral flow cytometry has closed the gap between flow and mass cytometry in terms of the maximum number of antibodies that can be used. More antibodies per panel saves on time, allows understanding of a larger picture, and requires fewer numbers of cells per experiment, which is particularly advantageous when samples are limited such as with tumour studies.

The use of the heavy metal isotopes also lowers background when compared to using fluorescent antibodies. Some cell types, such as myeloid cells, have high rates of autofluorescence that create a lot of background noise in flow cytometry. However, the rare heavy metal isotopes used are not present in biological systems, therefore there is very little or no background seen, and overall sensitivity is increased. The detection overlap between the different heavy metals is also very low compared to the overlap seen in fluorescent cytometry, which makes it much simpler to design a panel of many markers.

Fluorescent dyes are subject to photobleaching, requiring the entire process to happen within a few hours after staining. Metal tagged antibodies however are viable for up to two weeks without losing signal, adding more flexibility to experiments. The stained samples can also be cryopreserved, which may be particularly useful for clinical trials when samples are collected over a longer period of time.

Costs of CyTOF are high, as the metal-tagged antibodies and antibody conjunction kits are expensive. A major downside of CyTOF is that acquisition flow rate is quite slow compared to flow cytometry, by almost an order of magnitude. Because heavy metals are common in laboratory reagents, avoiding contamination during sample preparation is very important.
