= Delos White Beadle =

Canadian politician, horticultralist and journalist

Delos White Beadle (October 17, 1823 – August 30, 1905) was a horticulturist, journalist and municipal politician from St. Catharines, Ontario. He edited the Canadian Horticulturist from 1878 to late 1886, and was the author of Canada's first gardening guide, Canadian fruit, flower, and kitchen gardener.

== Biography ==
Beadle's father was a physician from New York State who established a successful practice and also became the owner of the St Catharines Nursery which quickly became an important cultivator of fruit trees.

Beadle served on St. Catharines City Council in 1886–87.
