= Spectrochimica Acta Part A =

Spectrochimica Acta Part A: Molecular and Biomolecular Spectroscopy
- Discipline: Spectroscopy
- Language: English
- Edited by: Malgorzata Baranska, Joel Bowman, Sylvio Canuto, Christian W. Huck, Judy Kim, Huimin Ma, Siva Umapathy

Publication details
- Former name(s): Spectrochimica Acta Part A: Molecular Spectroscopy
- History: 1939-present
- Publisher: Elsevier
- Frequency: 15/year
- Impact factor: 4.098 (2020)

Standard abbreviations
- ISO 4: Spectrochim. Acta A

Indexing
- CODEN: SAMCAS
- ISSN: 1386-1425
- LCCN: sn95026453
- OCLC no.: 39264973

Links
- Journal homepage; Online access

Spectrochimica Acta Part A: Molecular and Biomolecular Spectroscopy is a monthly peer-reviewed scientific journal covering spectroscopy.

According to the Journal Citation Reports, the journal has a 2011 impact factor of 2.098. Currently, the editors are Malgorzata Baranska, Joel Bowman, Sylvio Canuto, Christian W. Huck, Judy Kim, Huimin Ma, Siva Umapathy The journal was established in 1939 as Spectrochimica Acta. In 1967, Spectrochimica Acta was split into two journals, Spectrochimica Acta Part A: Molecular and Biomolecular Spectroscopy and Spectrochimica Acta Part B: Atomic Spectroscopy. Part A obtained its current title in 1995.
