= Mike Thorne (entrepreneur) =

Canadian businessman

- Born: c. 1978; Canada
- Citizenship: Canadian
- Education: Queen's University at Kingston
- Occupation: Entrepreneur
- Known for: Founder and CEO of junk removal company JustJunk

Mike Thorne is a Canadian entrepreneur and business owner. He is the founder of JustJunk, a Canadian junk removal service based in St. Catharines.

== Early life ==
Thorne was born in Canada and graduated in Economics from Queen's University in 2001.

== Career ==
Soon after he was employed at Bell Canada as a control centre manager where he was asked to remove 20 years-worth of office junk. At the time there were no such companies which offered any junk removal services. As a result, Thorne identified a need for junk removal services for businesses and residences.

Thorne left his job and started JustJunk in 2004 in St. Catharines with the goal of providing an easy junk removal service. The company would offer online and over the phone junk removal bookings to offices and homes around Canada and the United States.
