= Barry French (scientist) =

Canadian scientist and entrepreneur

(John) Barry French, born August 22, 1931, is a Canadian scientist and entrepreneur. He received his PhD in chemical engineering from the University of Toronto in 1961. He is a Fellow of the Royal Society of Canada and a Fellow of the Canadian Academy of Engineering. French was appointed a Member of the Order of Canada in 2007 and is co-founder of SCIEX, a mass spectrometer company now owned by Danaher Corporation.

== Research ==
French became full professor at the University of Toronto Institute of Aerospace Studies (UTIAS) in 1968, and served as associate director from 1974 to 1982. He was half-time dean of the University of Toronto School of Graduate Studies from 1982 to 1985. French's early research interests were in the field of molecular beams, rarefied gas dynamics and space simulation. He developed a hypersonic beam space simulator at UTIAS. In 1969 he was asked by NASA to collaborate with Alfred O. C. Nier at the University of Minnesota by making his apparatus available to test the Upper Atmosphere Mass Spectrometer that Nier was developing for the Viking Mars mission planned for 1976. The ability of this apparatus to produce hypersonic Mach 15 beams, half the speed of the Mars entry, allowed the mass spectrometer to be tested and calibrated properly. His work on molecular beams and gaseous ion sources lead to his interest in atmospheric pressure ion sources coupled to mass spectrometry.

Over his career French has received more than a dozen patents and authored over 60 scientific papers.

== Apollo 13 ==
On April 16, 1970, French received a phone call from Grumman Aerospace Corp. requesting assistance with an issue that arose during the Apollo 13 emergency and its return to earth. A team of six UTIAS professors was assembled to quickly provide advice on how much air pressure to use to separate and push the lunar module (LM) away from the command module (CM) prior to re-entry, both properly separating the modules and avoiding damage to the CM hatch. In 2010, the group of six scientists was honoured by the University of Toronto with medals presented to the remaining members by the Canadian Air and Space Museum.

== SCIEX ==
French, together with scientists Neil Reid and Adele Buckley and businessman William Breukelman, founded SCIEX in 1974 to develop a mass spectrometer system based on atmospheric pressure ionisation and direct air sampling. The company was acquired by MDS Inc. in 1981 and eventually became part of Danaher Corporation.
