= SCIEX =

Mass spectrometer company and brand, now owned by Danaher

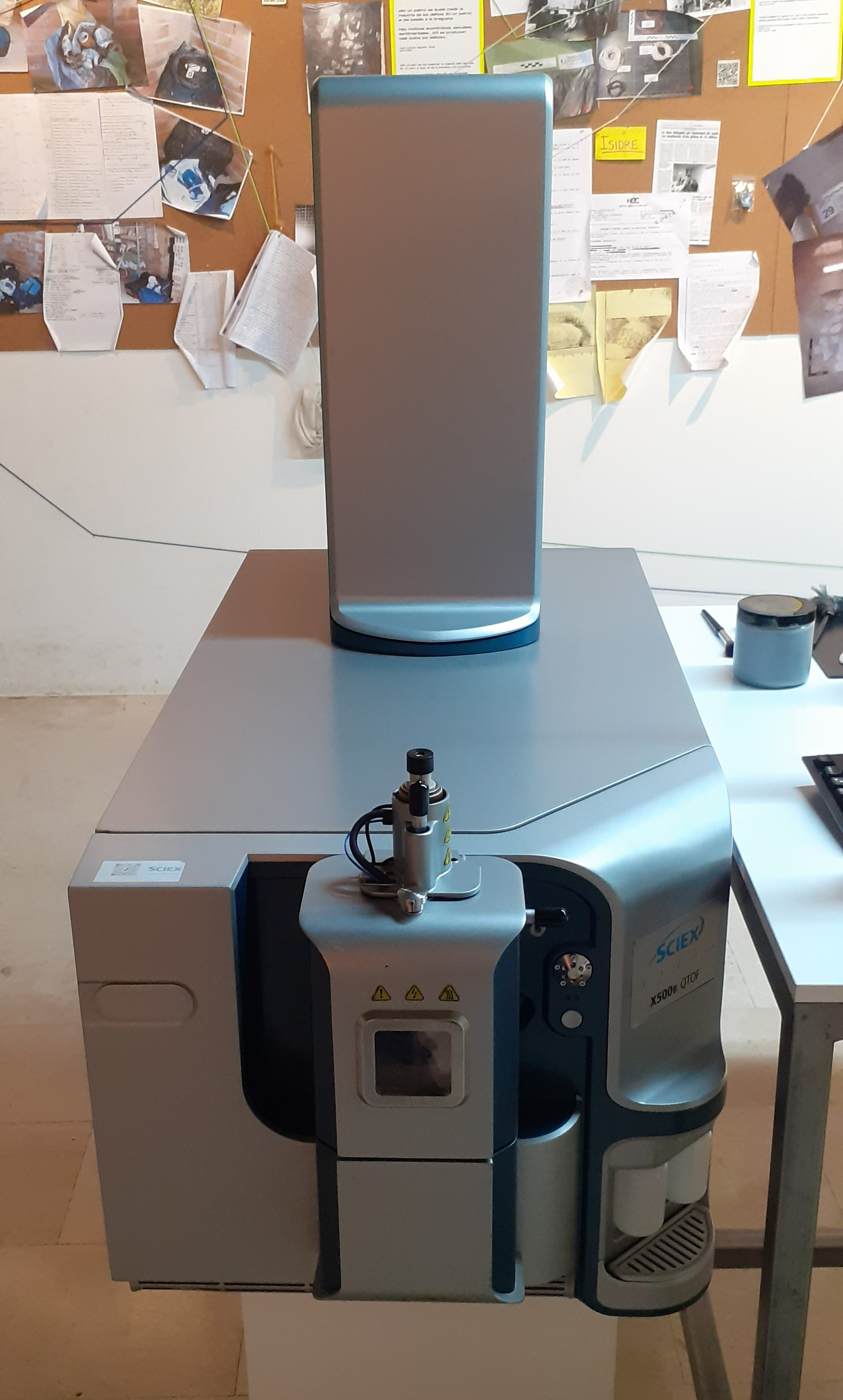
spectrometer SCIEX X500B QTOF

SCIEX is a manufacturer of mass spectrometry instrumentation used in biomedical and environmental applications. Originally started by scientists from the University of Toronto Institute for Aerospace Studies, it is now part of Danaher Corporation with the SCIExe R&D division still located in Toronto, Canada.

== History ==
SCIEX was founded in 1974 by Canadian scientists Barry French, Neil Reid, Adele Buckley, and businessman William Breukelman, to develop a mass spectrometer system based on atmospheric pressure ionisation and direct air sampling.

In 1981, SCIEX was acquired by MDS Inc., a Canadian medical services and equipment company. A joint venture was formed with PerkinElmer for sales and marketing of the inductively coupled plasma mass spectrometry (ICPMS) product line. In 1986, the joint venture was extended to include the liquid chromatography–mass spectrometry (LC/MS) business, managed through the Applied Biosystems division of Perkin Elmer.

In 2008, Applied Biosystems merged with Invitrogen to form Life Technologies. In 2009, Danaher Corporation paid approximately $1.1 billion to buy SCIEX from MDS and the Applied Biosystems/MDS SCIEX joint venture business from Life Technologies. The business unit now operates as SCIEX within the Life Sciences Division of Danaher and is one of the major players in the global mass spectrometry market estimated (in 2018) at $5.5 billion worldwide.

== Real-time air monitoring ==
The first SCIEX product, introduced in 1979, was the TAGA (Trace Atmospheric Gas Analyzer) quadrupole mass spectrometer system, which used atmospheric-pressure chemical ionization (APCI) for direct air analysis. Use of a cryopump vacuum system run by a liquid helium compressor allowed the instrument to be mounted in a large van for mobile operation, and operated while in motion to monitor concentrations of air pollutants. In 1981, the TAGA 6000, the first commercial triple quadrupole mass spectrometer, was introduced also in both lab-based and mobile configurations. Systems were acquired by, among others, government environmental agencies in Ontario and New York State, and the USEPA, and have been used in various applications such as tracking fugitive emission plumes from industrial sites, analysis of gases from contaminated homes in the Love Canal area and for air monitoring in the Gulf area after the BP spill in 2010. In 1979, the TAGA 3000 was used for real-time monitoring of toxic gas plumes of chlorine, styrene and other gases released from the Mississauga train derailment and fire providing timely information for emergency personnel.

== Inductively-Couple Plasma/Mass Spectrometry (ICPMS) ==
In 1983, SCIEX introduced the first commercial ICPMS system for inorganic analysis. Shortly after introduction, a joint venture was formed with Perkin Elmer to market and sell this product. The ICPMS joint venture business was fully acquired by PerkinElmer in 2010.

== Contraband detection ==
In 1984, a joint venture was formed between MDS SCIEX and British Aerospace to develop a tandem mass spectrometer system for contraband detection. Based on the TAGA platform, the AROMIC was a triple quadrupole instrument that was part of the CONDOR, an integrated contraband detection system for screening shipping containers for the presence of drugs and explosives. The CONDOR system consisted of a large X-Ray facility for imaging whole shipping containers, combined with the AROMIC mass spectrometer system to sample container air space for the presence of vapours and particulates indicative of the presence of drugs, alcohol or explosives. Designed for rapid screening of containers at border crossings, systems were sold and installed in two countries in the Middle and Far East.

== Liquid Chromatography-Mass Spectrometry (LC-MS) ==
In collaboration with Professor Jack Henion at Cornell University and Dr. Peter Dawson at the National Research Council of Canada, the first application of liquid chromatography-mass spectrometry-mass spectrometry (LC-MS-MS) was demonstrated on the TAGA 6000 in 1982. This proof of concept led to the development of the heated nebulizer LC interface for APCI, using pneumatic nebulization to allow the full LC flow to enter the ion source. In 1983, LC-MS-MS using ion evaporation, a spray method similar to electrospray but compatible with higher flow rates of up to 1 mL/min, was demonstrated on the TAGA 6000 but was not commercialized.

The API III LC-MS-MS system introduced in 1989 provided both ion spray (developed by Bruins, Covey and Henion at Cornell University) and heated nebulizer LC inlets on a triple quadrupole platform based on the TAGA 6000 architecture. It was the second commercial LC-MS in the market, and the first that provided electrospray ionization. The atmospheric pressure spray methods of electrospray, ion spray and APCI which helped to drive the burgeoning LC-MS market are now available on a wide variety of MS platforms and from a variety of vendors.

In 1998, the cryopump API III platform began to be replaced with turbo-molecular-pumped single and triple quadrupole mass spectrometer products that evolved from the API 2000 (benchtop) and API 3000 to the current API 7500 series.

In the 1990s, collaboration with physicist Ken Standing's group at the University of Manitoba led to the introduction of the QSTAR quadrupole/time-of-flight (QTOF) instrument in 1999, which evolved into the present day line of ZENO TOF 7600 series and benchtop X500-Series products.

In 2010, SCIEX acquired the liquid chromatography business of Eksigent Corporation and now offers a range of liquid chromatographs that couple to their mass spectrometers. The SelectION differential ion mobility spectrometer was introduced as an alternative method of separation in front of the mass spectrometer.

== Linear ion trap ==
The QTrap, introduced by SCIEX in 1995, is a linear ion trap consisting of a quadrupole mass filter that can act as either a mass filter or a trap/scan mass spectrometer.

== Patent infringement lawsuit ==
In 2002, MDS (at that time owner of SCIEX) and joint venture partner Applied Biosystems, won a $52.6 million judgement against Micromass UK for infringement of U.S. Patent No. 4,963,736 that describes a method of ion focusing using RF fields and gas collisions.
