= Gate (cytometry) =

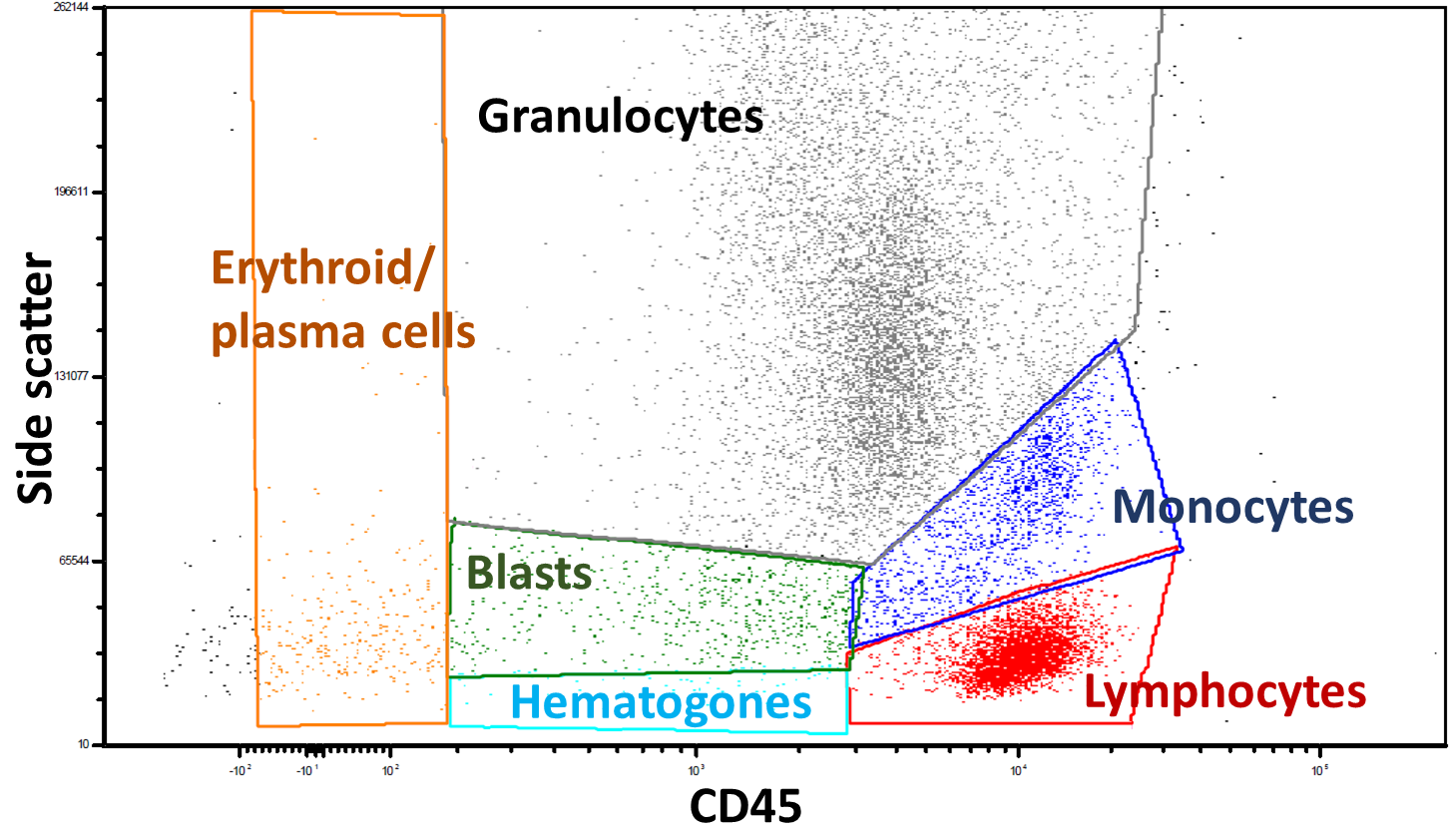
Flow cytometry gating into main categories of blood cells by side scatter and CD45.

A gate in cytometry is a set of value limits (boundaries) that serve to isolate a specific group of cytometric events from a large set. Gates can be defined by discrimination analysis, or can simply be drawn around a given set of data points on a printout and then converted to a computer-useful form. Gates can be implemented with a physical blinder. Gates may be used either to selectively gather data or to segregate data for analysis.

== Division ==
Gates are divided mathematically into inclusive gates and exclusive gates. Inclusive gates select data that falls within the limits set, while exclusive gates select data that falls outside the limits.

== Live gate ==
A live gate is a term used for a process that prevents the acquisition by the computer of non-selected data from the flow cytometer.
