= Flow Cytometry Standard =

Data file standard

Flow Cytometry Standard (FCS) is a data file standard for the reading and writing of data from flow cytometry experiments. The FCS specification has traditionally been developed and maintained by the International Society for Advancement of Cytometry (ISAC). FCS used to be the only widely adopted file format in flow cytometry. Recently, additional standard file formats have been developed by ISAC. The most recent published specification is FCS 3.2.

== File Format ==
The FCS file format describes a file that is a combination of textual data followed by binary data. The order of the file layout is as follows:

1. HEADER segment
2. TEXT segment
3. DATA segment
4. Optional ANALYSIS segment
5. CRC value
6. Optional OTHER segments

The HEADER segment is an ASCII text string that begins by identifying the version of the FCS standard used, followed by three pairs of byte offsets that designate the positions of the TEXT, DATA, and ANALYSIS segments. An example header segment is given below

FCS3.0          58    4380    4381    5586       0       0

Because the field width of the header segment byte positions is constrained by 8 characters, the maximum position it is capable of storing is 99,999,999. Anything beyond that is encoded as a 0 for both the start and end position, and the corresponding TEXT segment keyword is used instead.

The text segment is an ASCII text string that is divided into a series of key-value pairs that are delimited by some chosen character, e.g. '|'. The first character immediately following the header segment is the delimiter. An example of a header and text segment is given below

FCS3.0          58    4380    4381    5586       0       0|$BEGINANALYSIS|0|$BEGINDATA|4381|$BEGINSTEXT|0|$BTIM|08:24:37.64|$BYTEORD|1,2,3,4|$CELLS|RBC|...|

To be a valid FCS file, the text segment must contain all required keywords, which describe the DATA segment format and encoding. For FCS version 3.1, the required FCS primary TEXT segment keywords are as follows:

Keyword	Description
$BEGINANALYSIS	Byte-offset to the beginning of the ANALYSIS segment.
$BEGINDATA	Byte-offset to the beginning of the DATA segment.
$BEGINSTEXT	Byte-offset to the beginning of a supplemental TEXT segment.
$BYTEORD	Byte order for data acquisition computer.
$DATATYPE	Type of data in DATA segment (ASCII, integer, floating point).
$ENDANALYSIS	Byte-offset to the last byte of the ANALYSIS segment.
$ENDDATA	Byte-offset to the last byte of the DATA segment.
$ENDSTEXT	Byte-offset to the last byte of a supplemental TEXT segment.
$MODE	Data mode (list mode - preferred, histogram - deprecated).
$NEXTDATA	Byte offset to next data set in the file.
$PAR	Number of parameters in an event.
$PnB	Number of bits reserved for parameter number n.
$PnE	Amplification type for parameter n.
$PnN	Short name for parameter n.
$PnR	Range for parameter number n.
$TOT	Total number of events in the data set.

The DATA segment of the FCS file follows after the TEXT segment and is laid out event-wise (row-wise) according to the order described in the parameters (a.k.a. channels) $P1N $P2N$...PnN. An event is either an actual biological cell or some other mass that was large enough to trigger the data acquisition capturing device of the flow cytometer instrument. Data segments hold the following layout:

Data Segment
[Event1][Event2][Event3]...[Event$TOT]

Each event is laid out according to the number of bytes described by $PnB for each parameter. These bytes are to be interpreted according to the combination specified by $BYTEORD and $DATATYPE.

Event
[$P1B][$P2B][$P3B]...[$PnB]

== Data structure ==
Flow cytometry data is typically saved for analysis in the form of an array, with fluorescence and scatter channels represented in columns, and individual "events" (most of which are cells) forming the rows. The number of events acquired from each sample usually ranges between the low thousands and the low millions.

Representation of flow cytometry data from an instrument with three scatter channels and 13 fluorescent channels. Only the values for the first 30 (of hundreds of thousands) of cells are shown.

== History ==
The first version of a Flow Cytometry Standard (FCS) was developed in 1984. Since then, FCS became the standard file format supported by all flow cytometry software and hardware vendors. FCS is a binary file format with three main segments: a text segment containing meta data in keyword/value pairs structures, a data segment usually containing a matrix of detected expression values (so called list mode format), and a rarely used analysis segment.

Over the years, updates were incorporated to adapt to technological advancements in both flow cytometry and computing technologies.

In 1990, FCS 2.0 was introduced. Features introduced in FCS 2.0 included the option of multiple data sets within a data file, the use of different byte orders accommodating hardware variations on different computing platforms, and basic compensation and scaling information. FCS 2.0 was followed by FCS 3.0 in 1997, which introduced the possibility of storing data sets larger than 100MB.

FCS 3.1 was introduced in 2010. It retains the basic FCS file structure and most features of previous versions of the standard. Changes included in FCS 3.1 address potential ambiguities in the previous versions and provide a more robust standard. They include simplified support for international characters and improved support for storing compensation. The major additions are support for preferred display scale, a standardized way of capturing the sample volume, information about the origins of the data file, and support for plate and well identification in high throughput, plate based experiments.

FCS 3.2 was published in 2021 as a revision of FCS 3.1. It incorporated a decade of community feedback and introduced more precise ways to describe instrument conditions and measurement features.

== See also ==
- Flow cytometry
- Flow cytometry bioinformatics
