= Collision/reaction cell =

Device used in inductively coupled plasma mass spectrometry

A collision/reaction cell is a device used in inductively coupled plasma mass spectrometry to remove interfering ions through ion/neutral reactions.

== Dynamic reaction cell ==
The collision reaction cell, also known by the trade name "dynamic reaction cell" (DRC), was introduced by Perkin-Elmer on their Elan DRC (followed by Elan DRC II and Elan DRC-e) instrument. The dynamic reaction cell is a chamber placed before the traditional quadrupole chamber of an ICP-MS device, for eliminating isobaric interferences. The chamber has a quadrupole and can be filled with reaction (or collision) gases (ammonia, methane, oxygen or hydrogen), with one gas type at a time or a mixture of two of them, which reacts with the introduced sample, eliminating some of the interference.

The DRC is characterized by to main parameters that can be modified: RPq (the corresponding q parameter from the Mathieu equation) and RPa (the corresponding a parameter from the Mathieu equation). These parameters refer to the voltage applied to the quadrupole rods and the gas flow of the reaction gas.

Ammonia gas is typically chosen to mitigate the majority of interferences. However, for specific isotopes, other gasses may be required for better results, or mathematical correction if no gas offers a satisfactory advantage.

== Collisional reaction interface (CRI) or mini-Collision/Reaction Cell ==
The proprietary collisional reaction interface (CRI) used in the Bruker ICP-MS Aurora M90 destroys interfering ions. These ions are removed by injecting a collisional gas (He), or a reactive gas (H_{2}), or a mixture of the two, directly into the plasma as it flows through the skimmer cone and/or the sampler cone. Supplying the reactive/collisional gas into the tip of the skimmer cone induces extra collisions and reactions that destroy polyatomic ions in the passing plasma. Fundamentally CRI is a mini- Collision/Reaction Cell installed in front of the parabolic Ion Mirror optics.

== Axial field technology ==
Axial field technology (AFT) is a patented improvement of DRC made by Perkin-Elmer, which consists in two supplementary rods placed in the DRC cell, smaller than normal quadrupole's rods, with the purpose of "pushing" the ions faster to the exit by generating a supplementary electric potential, minimizing the time needed for the gas to be in the DRC and improving analysis speed. The suplimetary potential of the AFT rods does not contribute significantly to the global energy, but drastically improve ion passage time.

== Collision cell technology with kinetic energy discrimination ==
Thermo Scientific's XSeries2 instrument utilizes a collision/reaction cell for interference removal, consisting of a non-consumable hexapole and chicane ion deflector, which takes the ion beam off-axis and leads to low instrument backgrounds of <0.5 integrated counts per second (icps) at vacant masses such as 5 and 220. This hexapole is inherently part of the Thermo lens system and is present in the ion path, regardless of the use of the collision cell. The collision/reaction gas mixtures can be 1% NH_{3} in He, 7% H_{2} in He and 100% H_{2}, where the NH_{3} and H_{2} are reactive gasses and the He is a collisional gas. The 3rd generation cell utilizes kinetic energy discrimination, which employs running the quadrupole bias slightly less negative (more positive) than the hexapole bias. Polyatomic ions generated within the plasma can have larger atomic radii than analyte ions of similar mass, i.e. the interferent NaAr^{+} (mass 63) is larger than the analyte Cu^{+} (mass 63). Thus, when using a collisional/reactive gas mixture, these larger species undergo more collisions/reactions in the cell, in which they lose increasingly more energy, and are then excluded from the quadrupole mass filter by the kinetic energy barrier.

== Octopole reaction system ==
Another implementation of this type of interference removal is an octopole (instead of a quadrupole) collision cell, implemented by Agilent's 7500 series. The octopole reaction system (ORS)) uses only helium or hydrogen and the volume of the cell is smaller than that of a DRC. The small molecules of helium and hydrogen collide with the large, unwanted polyatomic ions formed in the plasma and break them up into other ions that can be separated in the quadrupole mass analyser. However, unlike the DRC the OCR system is based only on collision reactions and not on chemical reactions.
