= Spectrochimica Acta Part B =

Spectrochimica Acta Part B: Atomic Spectroscopy
- Discipline: Spectroscopy (AAS, AES, AFS, LIBS, MS, XRF)
- Language: English, French, German
- Edited by: M. T. C. de Loos-Vollebregt, A. De Giacomo

Publication details
- Former name: Spectrochimica Acta
- History: 1939–present
- Publisher: Elsevier
- Frequency: 14/year
- Impact factor: 3.086 (2019)

Standard abbreviations
- ISO 4: Spectrochim. Acta B

Indexing
- CODEN: SAASBH
- ISSN: 0584-8547
- LCCN: 74016632
- OCLC no.: 1766329

Links
- Journal homepage

Spectrochimica Acta Part B: Atomic Spectroscopy is a monthly peer-reviewed scientific journal covering spectroscopy.

The journal was established in 1939 as Spectrochimica Acta. In 1967, Spectrochimica Acta was split into two journals – Spectrochimica Acta Part A: Molecular and Biomolecular Spectroscopy and Spectrochimica Acta Part B: Atomic Spectroscopy. Part B obtained its current title around the time of the split.

According to the Journal Citation Reports, the journal has a 2019 impact factor of 3.086.

As of April 2024 the editor-in-chief is Alessandro De Giacomo of the University of Bari, Italy.

== See also ==
- Elsevier / Spectrochimica Acta Atomic Spectroscopy Award
