= Mass cytometry =

Laboratory technique

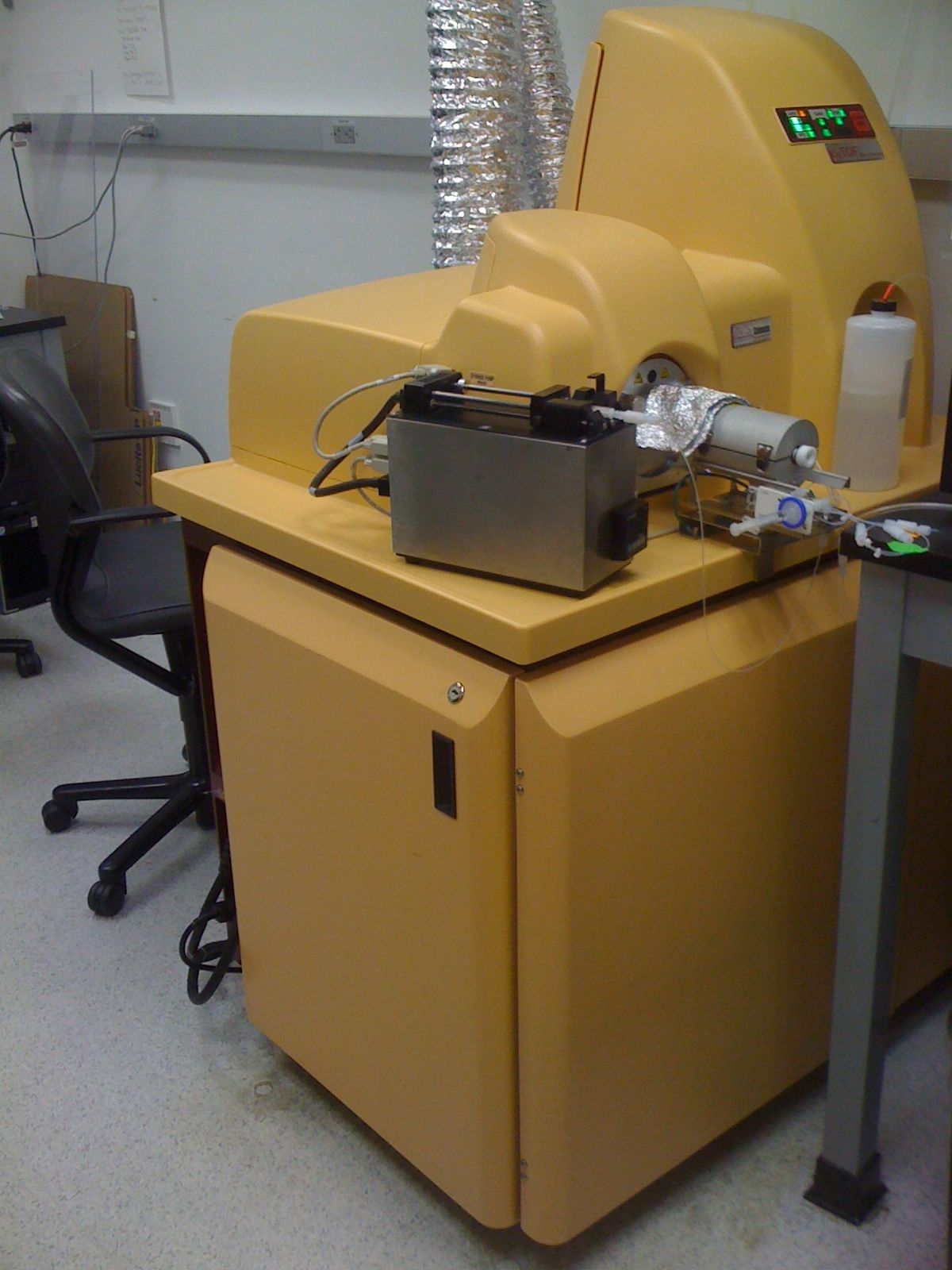
A mass cytometer

Mass cytometry is a high-dimensional single-cell analysis technique that integrates flow cytometry with time of flight mass spectrometry. It is used for the determination of the properties of cells (cytometry). In this approach, antibodies are conjugated with isotopically pure elements, and these antibodies are used to label cellular proteins. Cells are nebulized and sent through an argon plasma, which ionizes the metal-conjugated antibodies. The metal signals are then analyzed by a time-of-flight mass spectrometer. The approach overcomes limitations of spectral overlap in flow cytometry by utilizing discrete isotopes as a reporter system instead of traditional fluorophores which have broad emission spectra.

== History and Development ==
Tagging technology and instrument development occurred at the University of Toronto and DVS Sciences, Inc. CyTOF (cytometry by time of flight) was initially commercialized by DVS Sciences in 2009. In 2014, Fluidigm acquired DVS Sciences to become a reference company in single cell technology. The technology evolved through models like CyTOF, CyTOF2, Helios (CyTOF3) and CyTOF XT, with the latter announced in 2021. In 2022 Fluidigm received a capitol infusion and changed its name to Standard BioTools. In 2023, Standard BioTools introduced the Hyperion XTi Imaging System, advancing Imaging Mass Cytometry (IMC) with capabilities such as whole slide imaging, automated sample processing, and dual imaging/flow cytometry modes. In 2024, the company expanded its high-throughput imaging options with two additional rapid modes and an automated slide loader that can be installed directly on the Hyperion XTi for automatic loading and acquisition of up to 40 slides. Additionally, a 2024 collaboration with Navignostics was announced to develop clinical research applications using the Hyperion XTi system . In 2025, Standard BioTools announced the CyTOF XT Pro System, streamlining workflow with up to 4x faster throughput and software with 21 CFR Part 11 compliance enabling features.

== Imaging Mass Cytometry (IMC) ==
Imaging mass cytometry (IMC) is a relatively new imaging technique, emerged from previously available CyTOF technology (cytometry by time of flight), that combines mass spectrometry with UV laser ablation to generate pseudo images of tissue samples. This approach adds spatial resolution to the data, which enables simultaneous analysis of multiple cell markers at subcellular resolution and their spatial distribution in tissue sections. The IMC approach, in the same way as CyTOF, relies on detection of metal-tagged antibodies using time-of-flight mass spectrometry, allowing for quantification of up to 40 markers simultaneously.

== Data analysis ==
CyTOF mass cytometry data is recorded in tables that list, for each cell, the signal detected per channel, which is proportional to the number of antibodies tagged with the corresponding channel's isotope bound to that cell. These data are formatted as FCS files, which are compatible with traditional flow cytometry software. Due to the high-dimensional nature of mass cytometry data, novel data analysis tools have been developed as well.

Imaging Mass Cytometry data analysis has its specificity due to different nature of data obtained. In terms of data analysis, both IMC and CyTOF generate large datasets with high dimensionality that require specialized computational methods for analysis. However, data generated by IMC can be more challenging to analyze due to additional data complexity and need for specific tools and pipelines specific for digital image analysis, whereas the data generated by CyTOF is generally analyzed using conventional flow cytometry software. A comprehensive overview of IMC data analysis techniques has been given by Milosevic in.

== Advantages and disadvantages ==
Advantages include minimal overlap in metal signals meaning the instrument is theoretically capable of detecting 100 parameters per cell, entire cell signaling networks can be inferred organically without reliance on prior knowledge, and one well-constructed experiment produces large amounts of data.

Disadvantages, in the case of CyTOF, include the practical flow rate is around 500 cells per second versus several thousand in flow cytometry and current reagents available limit cytometer use to around 50 parameters per cell. Additionally, mass cytometry is a destructive method and cells cannot be sorted for further analysis. In the case of IMC, the resolution of the data is relatively low (1μm2/pixel), the technique is as well destructive, acquiring of the data is also very slow, and it requires specialized expensive equipment and expertise.

== Applications ==
Mass cytometry has research applications in medical fields including immunology, hematology, and oncology. It has been used in studies of hematopoiesis, cell cycle, cytokine expression, and differential signaling responses.

MC has been used in various research fields, such as cancer biology, immunology, and neuroscience, to provide a more comprehensive understanding of tissue architecture and cellular interactions.
