= Standard BioTools =

American life science tools company

Standard BioTools Inc.
- Formerly: Fluidigm Corporation; Mycometrix
- Type: Public
- Traded as: Nasdaq: LAB; Russell 2000 component
- Founded: 1999; 27 years ago
- Headquarters: Boston, Massachusetts, United States
- Key people: Michael Egholm (president & CEO)
- Revenue: ▼US$85 million (2025)
- Number of employees: 615 (2025)
- Website: standardbio.com

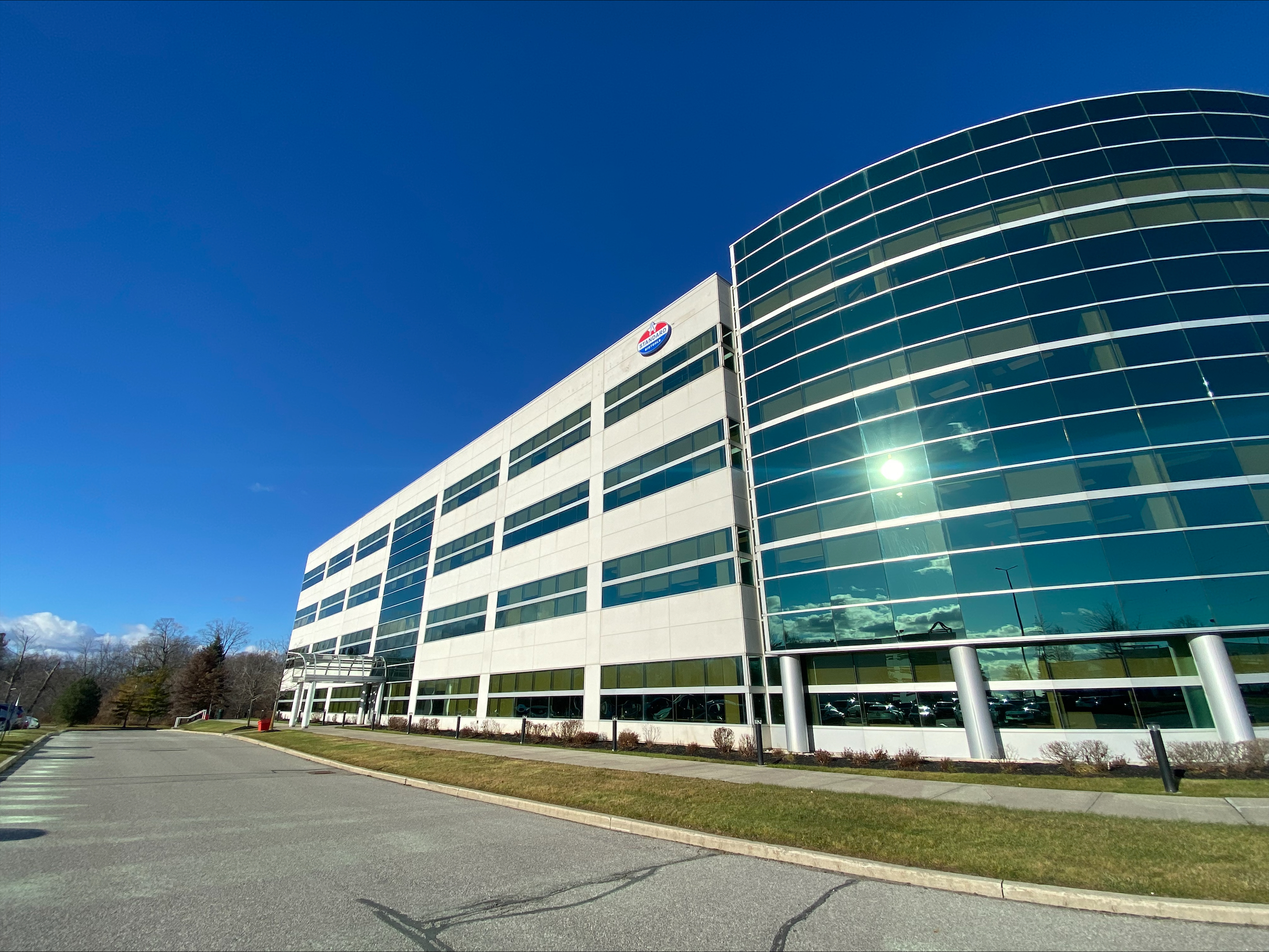
Standard BioTools Canada

Standard BioTools Inc., previously known as Fluidigm Corp., is an American life science tools company that offers analytical mass cytometry systems for flow cytometry and tissue imaging, along with associated assays and reagents, as well as an automated genomic analysis instrument and a variety of microfluidic arrays, or integrated fluidic circuits (IFCs), and consumables with fully kitted reagents. Custom assays and services are available with all systems and applications.

Standard BioTools sells products to academic research institutions; translational research and medical centers; cancer centers; clinical research laboratories; biopharmaceutical, biotechnology and plant and animal research companies; and contract research organizations.

== Business model ==
Standard BioTools is a public company traded on the Nasdaq stock exchange, previously under the ticker symbol FLDM, currently under LAB.

Its genomic analysis products create microfluidic devices or IFCs. Genomics applications using IFCs processed on the Biomark™ X9 System for High-Throughput Genomics include gene expression and genotyping by PCR and NGS library preparation for pathogen detection, agrigenomics, sample identification and pharmacogenomics.

Its proteomic analysis products are based on technology developed by DVS Sciences, acquired by Fluidigm® in 2014. DVS is best known for its multiparameter single-cell protein analysis systems, which analyze antibody/metal complexes using atomic mass spectrometry. The technology enables precise, high-parameter single-cell protein analysis for applications in life sciences research.

The company has remained a pioneer in integrated microfluidic technology, with continued iterations of IFCs for a growing variety of applications. It is also the only company developing mass cytometry technologies for both flow cytometry and imaging applications.

== History ==
The company was founded in 1999 as Mycometrix by Stephen Quake and Gajus Worthington. The company was formed to commercialize technology developed by Quake at the California Institute of Technology referred to as microfluidic large-scale integration and branded IFCs^{[1]}. Richard DeLateur, a 20-year veteran of Intel, came on as chief financial officer in 2006. Worthington was the company’s chief executive officer from its inception in 1999 to 2016. Quake has remained a member of the company’s scientific advisory board.

The company’s founders created integrated circuits that carried fluids rather than electrons. In 2009, the company was described as “the world’s leading manufacturer of microfluidic devices.” The company’s original microfluidics products were aimed for use in applications such as protein crystallization, genotyping, DNA analysis and PCR.

The company completed a successful initial public offering (IPO) in February 2011, raising about $75 million. This followed a failed, ill-timed IPO in 2008. As of the 2011 IPO, Fluidigm had not yet become profitable. Following a $250 million investment from Casdin Capital, LLC and Viking Global Investors LP in April 2022, Fluidigm changed its name to Standard BioTools. This change in name emphasized their mission to create a diversified, scalable innovation-focused life science tools company serving the pharma research markets.

The company acquired Nasdaq-listed SomaLogic in January 2024 in an all-stock deal.

== Operations ==
At the end of 2023, Standard BioTools had a headcount of 500 personnel.

In addition to its headquarters and laboratory facility in South San Francisco, California, which it expanded in 2014, the company established the first biochip manufacturing facility in Singapore in 2005.

In 2022, Standard BioTools expanded their offices and manufacturing and research and development facility in Markham, Ontario.
