= Microscopy file formats =

File formats for microscopy data

Microscopy file formats are variations of image file formats used to encode results of microscopy acquision events along with metadata. There are hundreds of different file formats used in microscopy, including open formats like OME-TIFF and OME-Zarr and proprietary formats such as .lif and .czi.

== Conversions and data sharing ==
While microscope manufactures tailor formats to particular needs, data reuse and reproducibility are increased if image analysis pipelines are able to work with multiple file formats. For that reason, software tools like BioFormats and bioio provide utilities that convert different proprietary formats into a common representation, so the metadata and the pixel data can be processed by shared workflows. This kind of tooling enables seamless use of multiple file formats in popular tools, like ImageJ.

== Community-driven formats ==
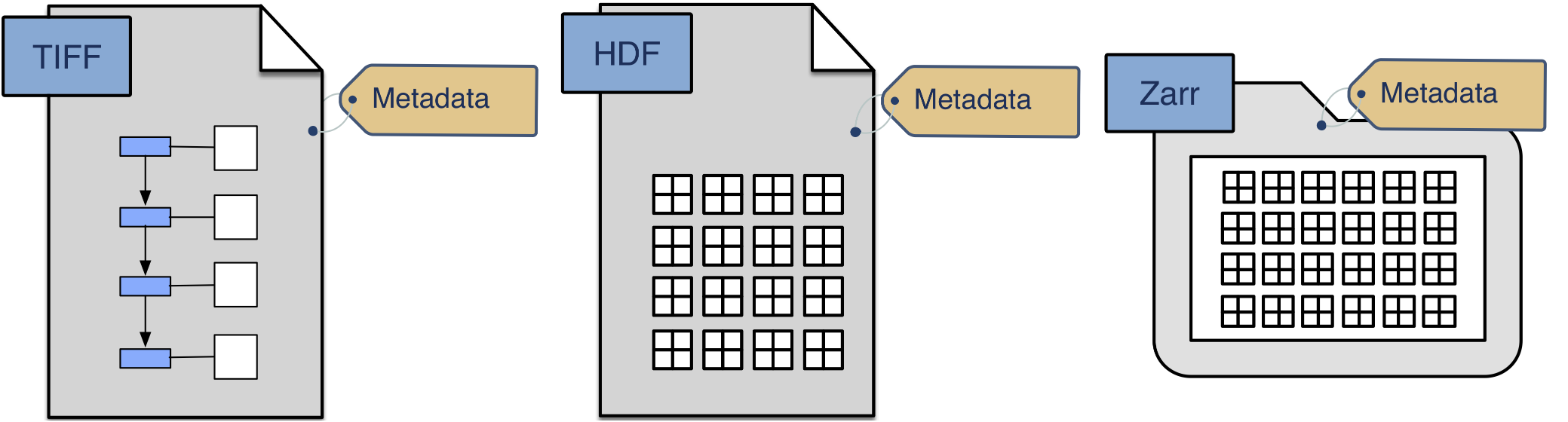
Three formats that can be used to store microscopy data, TIFF, HDF and Zarr.

OME-XML is a schema-centered metadata language representing imaging provenance (e.g., microscope, lens, detector), acquisition modality, coordinate mapping, and experiment details. Attributes such as channel wavelengths, Z index, timepoint, and objective are standardized for interoperability.

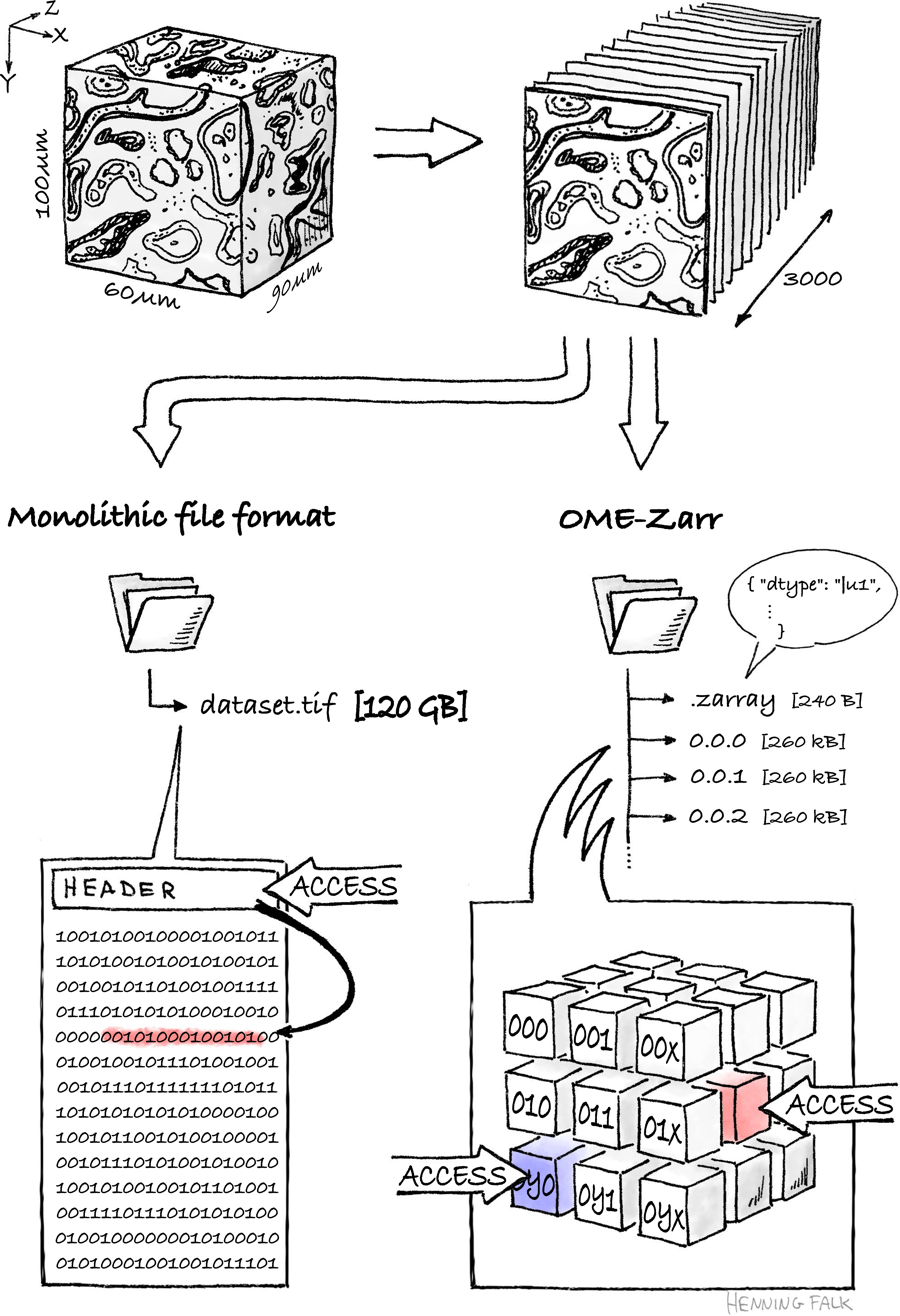
A comparison of monolithic (e.g. TIFF) to chunked (e.g. Zarr) file formats for microscopy

The community-driven format OME-TIFF is an open, extensible format developed by the Open Microscopy Environment that extends the classic TIFF structure-with its widespread library and tool support-by embedding structured OME-XML metadata within TIFF tags, particularly within the ImageDescription field of the first Image File Directory (IFD). The file specification is made available by the OME consortium. OME-TIFF is adopted in research and academic pathology where comprehensive metadata and analysis pipeline integration are prioritized. The Bio-Formats Java library and OMERO server provide read/write and management capabilities, with desktop analysis supported by QuPath and Fiji/ImageJ.

The OME-TIFF standard has also been adopted for use in digital pathology. The growth in microscopy data size and the need for cloud-ready formats prompted the development of the Next Generation File Format (OME-NGFF) endeavour, which selected Zarr, a standard storing large multidimensional array data. as the base for the OME-Zarr next-generation format, encoding, for example multidimensional image pyramids. The OME-Zarr specification enables representation of outputs of complex experiments, such as high content screening assays and parallel access to data chunks served over object storage.

Multimodal endeavours such as spatial transcriptomics, which adds challenges from the transcriptomics to those of bioimaging also benefit from modern file formats, such as SpatialData, which builds upon the OME-Zarr standard.

The open DICOM standard. commonly used in the medical domain, has also been used as a microscopy file format.

== List of microscopy file formats ==
The BioFormats library lists at least 164 different file formats used in microscopy, though the total number of formats and variants may be considerably more. A list of microscopy file formats includes:

name	extension	developer/owner	example usage	documentation
OME-TIFF	.tiff, .ome.tiff	Open Microscopy Environment	WSI	official website
OME-Zarr	.zarr, .ome.zarr, .ozx	Open Microscopy Environment	spatial transcriptomics, volume EM, light sheet fluorescence microscopy, FIB-SEM, STED	official website
CZI	.czi	Zeiss	CLSM, WSI	official website
Leica Image File Format	.lif	Leica Microsystems	CLSM	BioFormats
Zeiss AxioVision ZVI (Zeiss Vision Image)	.zvi	Zeiss	WSI	BioFormats
Olympus FluoView FV1000	.oib, .oif	Olympus	CLSM	BioFormats
Zeiss LSM 510/710	.lsm	Zeiss	CLSM	BioFormats
NDPI	.ndpi, ndpis	Hamamatsu	WSI	OpenSlide
Aperio SVS	.svs	Aperio (now Leica)	WSI	OpenSlide
Leica SCN	.scn	Leica	WSI	BioFormats
Ventana BIF/TIF	.bif, .tif	Ventana (Roche Digital Diagnostics)	WSI	OpenSlide
DICOM	.dcm	National Electrical Manufacturers Association	WSI, CLSM, FIB-SEM	OpenSlide
Nikon NIS-Elements ND2	.nd2	Nikon		BioFormats
Image Cytometry Standard ICS/IDS	.ics/.ids	-		
Image Cytometry Standard ICS2	.ics	-		
Aperio AFI	.afi	Aperio (now Leica)	WSI	BioFormats
Hamamatsu VMS	.vms	Hamamatsu	WSI	OpenSlide
MIRAX	.mrxs	Mirax	WSI	OpenSlide
PerkinElmer Vectra QPTIFF	.qptiff	PerkinElmer	WSI	BioFormats
Philips TIFF	.tiff	Philips	WSI	OpenSlide
Sakura format	.svslide	Sakura	WSI	OpenSlide
Trestle TIF	.tif	Trestle	WSI	OpenSlide
Olympus OIR	.oir	Olympus		BioFormats, FileInfo.com
Olympus packed OIR (POIR)	.poir	Olympus		

== See also ==
- BioImage informatics
- Microscopy
- ImageJ
- Open Microscopy Environment
