= Open Microscopy Environment =

Consortium for microscopy image data

- Abbreviation: OME
- Formation: 2005; 21 years ago
- Founder: Jason Swedlow, Ilya Goldberg, Peter K. Sorger
- Type: Research consortium
- Purpose: Open tools and standards for managing and sharing microscopy image data
- Products: OMERO; Bio-Formats; OME-TIFF; OME-Zarr
- Fields: bioimage informatics; microscopy
- Website: www.openmicroscopy.org

The Open Microscopy Environment, or OME, is a consortium that develops open-source infrastructure for microscopy. OME is known for maintaining the OMERO server system for managing microscopy files, the Bio-Formats library for converting proprietary file formats to interoperable alternatives as well as the image standards OME-TIFF and OME-Zarr.

== History ==
The project started around 2001 by Jason Swedlow, Ilya Goldberg and Peter Sorger, had its original vision published in Science in 2003, and launched officially in 2005.

The consortium published the OME-XML metadata model in 2005, which led to the file format OME-TIFF. In 2010, the Bio-Formats library was released, enabling conversion of proprietary file formats (such as Zeiss' .czi and Leica's .lif) to an open, interoperable format.

The OMERO.server software, for managing and sharing images, was built in 2006 using Bio-Formats to provide wide compatibility. It has been continuously improved, with extensions for multi-dimensional files and high-content screening. In 2017, OME launched The Image Data Resource, an open source database of bio-image files, built upon an OMERO server.

In 2021, the consortium published the efforts for new file formats compatible with cloud computing. The OME-NGFF (Next-Generation File Formats) community agreed upon using Zarr, subsequently starting a process to develop the OME-Zarr standard.

Jason Swedlow led the project with a team at the University of Dundee, jointly with the company Glencoe Software, until 2025, when he joined the Chan Zuckerberg Initiative. The consortium migrated to a leadership team composed of Jean-Marie Burel (University of Dundee), Josh Moore (German BioImaging), Stefanie Weidtkamp-Peters (HHU), Matthew Hartley (EMBL-EBI), and Virginie Uhlmann (University of Zurich).

== OMERO ==
The OME consortium developed and maintains OMERO, a modular, open-source platform for managing microscopy data. It uses the Bio-Formats library to translate over 100 proprietary file formats used in microscopy (such as Zeiss' .czi and Leica's .lif) to an open, interoperable format, the OME Model, using OME-XML.

The platform includes multiple components, including a Java back-end application (named OMERO.server) which orchestrates communication with databases hosting the metadata (e.g. in PostgreSQL) and the servers hosting the pixel data for images.

Users are able to interact with the database via clients, which interact with OMERO.server via a common API. For example, the application named OMERO.web, is a Django-based web application that communicates with the OMERO database, enabling users to explore microscopy collections in a browser. This provides an advantage to downloading the files themselves, as microscopy data can get large, often exceeding multiple gigabytes per file.

This modularity makes it possible for other, custom applications to interact with OMERO servers, including OMERO.importer, to process images for loading in OMERO, OMERO.figure (to construct publication-ready figures) and the "pythonic" interface ezomero.

=== Use cases ===
OMERO servers have been used in several scenarios related to research data management for microscopy. Use cases include high-content screening workflows, the sharing of digitized biological collections and educational use for shared virtual microscopes.

The Image Data Repository, an open source database of bio-image files, is built upon directly on an OMERO server.

Multiple institutions around the world host OMERO servers. The list spans multiple continents, including organizations like the University of São Paulo, the Smithsonian Tropical Research Institute and the Jackson Laboratory in the Americas, the University of Dundee, the Francis Crick Institute, the Technische Universität Dresden, the universities of Tübingen and Münster, and the Karolinska Institute in Europe, and RIKEN in Japan.

== File formats ==
The Open Microscopy Environment has developed standards to ensure long-term data compatibility of microscopy data using platform-independent file formats. The metadata in the file formats adheres to a common model, termed the OME-Model, originally expressed in XML.

OME-XML is a schema-centered metadata language representing imaging provenance (e.g., microscope, lens, detector), acquisition modality, coordinate mapping, and experiment details. Attributes such as channel wavelengths, Z index, timepoint, and objective are standardized for interoperability.

=== OME-TIFF ===
OME-TIFF is an open, extensible format developed by the Open Microscopy Environment (OME) consortium to address both the data and metadata needs of modern bioimaging. It extends the classic TIFF structure-with its widespread library and tool support-by embedding structured OME-XML metadata within TIFF tags, particularly within the ImageDescription field of the first Image File Directory (IFD). The file specification is made available by the OME consortium. Key features include:

- Pyramidal multi-resolution support: OME-TIFF uses TIFF’s SubIFD mechanism (Tag 330) to represent image pyramids, supporting rapid image navigation. Each level may use its own compression (JPEG, JPEG 2000, etc.), and BigTIFF extensions are supported for large file sizes.
- Multi-dimensionality: Supports Z-stacks, time series, multichannel imaging, and 3D/4D data organization.
- OME ecosystem: The Bio-Formats Java library and OMERO server provide read/write and management capabilities for OME-TIFF images, with desktop analysis supported by QuPath, Fiji/ImageJ, and others617.
- Validation and archiving: The format is openly specified, making it suitable for long-term research data stewardship, regulatory submission, and reproducible AI workflows.

OME-TIFF is adopted in research and academic pathology where comprehensive metadata and analysis pipeline integration are prioritized. The Bio-Formats Java library and OMERO server provide read/write and management capabilities, with desktop analysis supported by QuPath and Fiji/ImageJ.

=== OME-Zarr ===
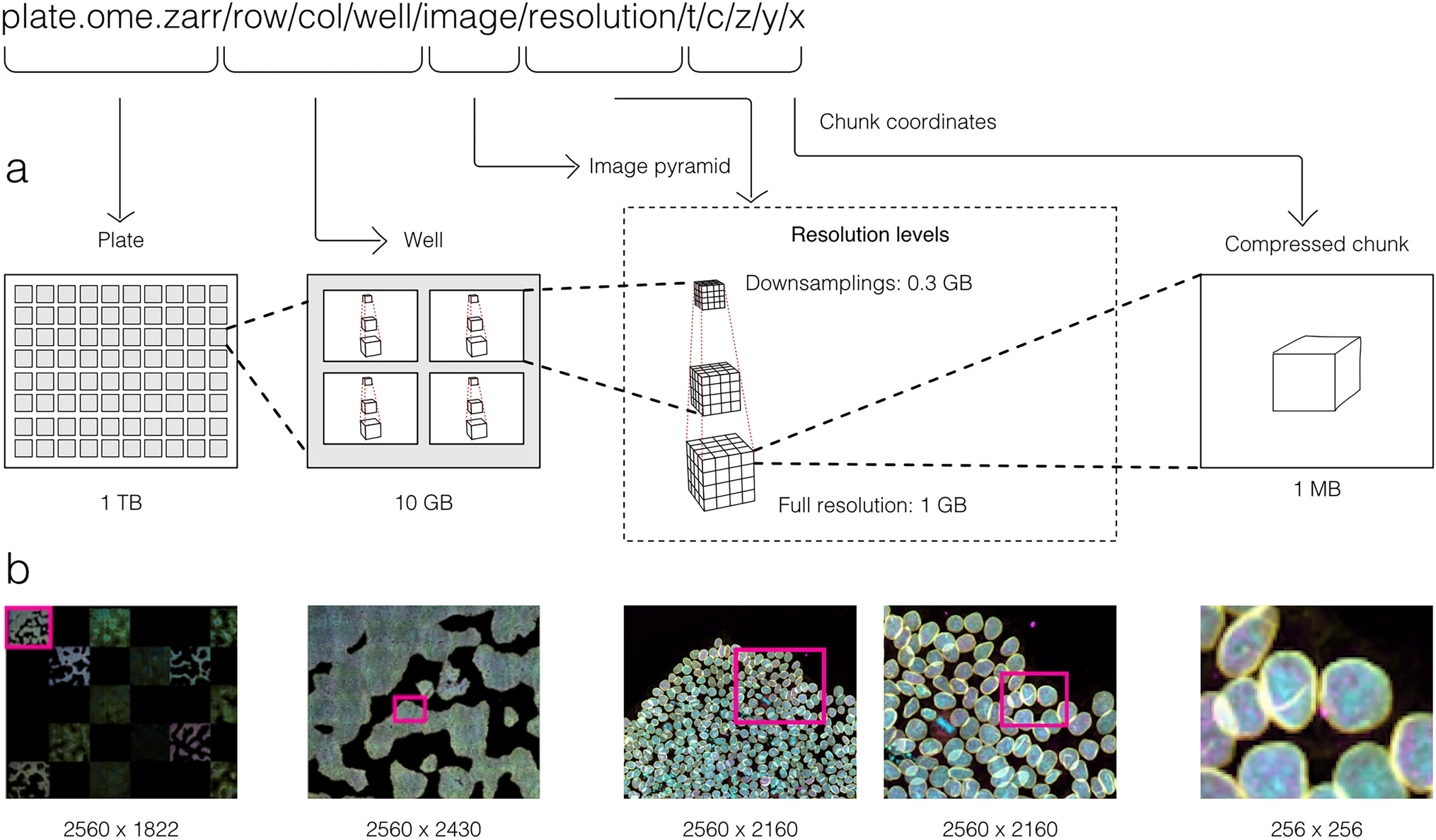
Representation of microscopy data for high-content screening using OME-Zarr.

Zarr is an open standard for storing large multidimensional array data. It specifies a protocol and data format, and is designed to be "cloud ready" including random access, by dividing data into subsets referred to as chunks. The OME-Zarr formad is based on Zarr with extensions to enable, for example, encoding of multidimensional image pyramids.

The .zarr specification enables granular representation of outputs of complex experiments, such as high content screening assays. Each plate read in the microscope contains multiple wells, and to scan each well, multiple fields are needed. Each image may have up to 5 dimensions (time points, imaging channels and the three space dimensions). It may also include resolution pyramids, enabling better performance of visualization tools. As Zarr uses multiple directories for organizing data, each of these different fields can be specified and retrieved independently, for example by retrieving a custom URL from object storage databases.

The OME-Zarr format is used by the BioImage Archive database to provide an interoperability layer for deposited datasets.
