= Jason Swedlow =

American-born cell biologist

Jason R. Swedlow
- Born: June 20, 1961 (age 65); Los Angeles, CA
- Education: University of California, San Francisco
- Known for: Open Microscopy Environment (OME)
- Awards: BBSRC Innovator of the Year, Fellow of the Royal Society of Edinburgh, Honorary Order of the British Empire
- Scientific career
- Fields: Cell Biology & Bioimage informatics
- Workplaces: University of Dundee, Chan Zuckerberg Biohub
- Thesis: Distribution and Dynamics of DNA Topoisomerase II in Drosophila Chromosomes (1994)
- Doctoral advisor: David Agard & John Sedat
- Website: https://openmicroscopy.org

Jason Swedlow is an American-born cell biologist and light microscopist who is Professor of Quantitative Cell Biology at the School of Life Sciences, University of Dundee, Scotland. He is a co-founder of the Open Microscopy Environment and Glencoe Software. In 2021, he joined Wellcome Leap as a Program Director of Delta Tissue. In 2025, he joined the Chan Zuckerberg Biohub as Senior Director, BioImaging Data.

== Education and career ==
Swedlow received a B.A. in Chemistry from Brandeis University in Waltham, Massachusetts, in 1982. He then earned a Ph.D. in Biophysics from UCSF in 1994, under the direction of David Agard and John Sedat. After a postdoctoral fellowship with Tim Mitchison at UCSF and then Harvard Medical School, Swedlow established his own laboratory in 1998 at the Wellcome Trust Biocentre, University of Dundee, as a Wellcome Trust Career Development Fellow. He was awarded a Wellcome Trust Senior Research Fellowship in 2002 and named Professor of Quantitative Cell Biology in 2007. From 2021 to 2024, he served in a part-time secondment as a Program Director at Wellcome Leap. He was named a Fellow of the Royal Society of Edinburgh in 2012 and appointed an Honorary OBE in 2021.

== Research ==
Swedlow's research focuses on mechanisms and regulation of chromosome segregation during mitotic cell division and the development of software tools for accessing, processing, sharing and publishing large scientific image datasets. He co-founded and led the Open Microscopy Environment, an international consortium that develops and releases open source software for biological imaging and Glencoe Software, which commercialises and customises OME technology for use in academic and biopharmaceutical research (e.g., Columbus from PerkinElmer, CellLibrarian from Yokogawa, and Amira from Thermo Fisher Scientific. He participated in Euro-BioImaging, Global BioImaging, and is co-Founder of BioImagingUK, a consortium of UK imaging scientists that develop, use, or administer imaging solutions for life sciences research. Using OME technology, he collaborated with EMBL-EBI to develop the Image Data Resource, a public data resource for reference images from bioimaging.

== Teaching ==
Swedlow has served as Faculty (since 1997) and Co-Director (2009–2014) of the Analytical and Quantitative Light Microscopy Course at the Marine Biological Laboratory in Woods Hole, Massachusetts, and participates as Faculty in the NCBS Bangalore Microscopy Course.
