= BioImage Archive =

Research data repository

Overview of the data flows in the BioImage Archive.

The BioImage Archive (BIA) is a research data repository hosting publicly accessible bioimaging datasets. It is hosted by the European Bioinformatics Institute, in the United Kingdom. It was first announced on 2 July 2019.

Its creation was proposed in 2018 to cater for the lack of a central public repository for microscopy images in the biosciences. In 2019, it was created based on the BioStudies database and extended the EMBL-EBI resources for imaging, which at the time included only EMPIAR (the Electron Microscopy Public Image Archive). BIA was also meant as a bridge between EMPIAR and the Image Data Resource, a public bioimaging database maintained by the Open Microscopy Environment consortium. In 2026, BioImage Archive entered the list of ELIXIR Core Data Resources.

The growth in data archived by BIA and EMPIAR.

As of 2026, BIA holds over 2,500 datasets and one petabytes of data. Datasets cover a wide range of subjects and are identified by alphanumeric identifiers of the format "S-BIAD0000". For example, a study about development of the Japanese eel is deposited under the identifier S-BIAD3325. Deposition on BioImage Archive is considered as a good practice for FAIR data in bioimaging.

BioImage Archive provides application program interfaces usable by the general public and other open-source software utilities.

The archive receives data submissions in a variety of file formats, including proprietary standards. As part of its FAIR data practices, BIA has a pipeline to normalize data and metadata, making use of the OME-Zarr data format and the RO-Crate metadata standard.

== See also ==
- Bioimage informatics
- FAIR principles
- Open Microscopy Environment
