= Volumetric Electron Microscopy =

Electron microscopy method for ultrastructure/cellular imaging

Gallery of volume EM images in the OME-Zarr format at EMPIAR.

Volumetric Electron Microscopy (Volume EM) is an electron microscopy method used to generate 3D reconstructions of thick (>500 nm) samples. The initial role of electron microscopes in imaging two-dimensional slices (TEM) or a specimen surface (SEM with secondary electrons) has also increasingly expanded into the depth of samples. An early example of these volume EM workflows was simply to stack TEM images of serial sections cut through a sample. The next development was virtual reconstruction of a thick section (200-500 nm) volume by backprojection of a set of images taken at different tilt angles - TEM tomography.

== Description ==
To acquire volume EM datasets of larger depths than TEM tomography (micrometers or millimeters in the z axis), a series of images taken through the sample depth can be used. For example, ribbons of serial sections can be imaged in a TEM as described above, and when thicker sections are used, serial TEM tomography can be used to increase the z-resolution. More recently, back scattered electron (BSE) images can be acquired of a larger series of sections collected on silicon wafers, known as SEM array tomography. An alternative approach is to use BSE SEM to image the block surface instead of the section, after each section has been removed. By this method, an ultramicrotome installed in an SEM chamber can increase automation of the workflow; the specimen block is loaded in the chamber and the system programmed to continuously cut and image through the sample. This is known as serial block face SEM. A related method uses focused ion beam milling instead of an ultramicrotome to remove sections. In these serial imaging methods, the output is essentially a sequence of images through a specimen block that can be digitally aligned in sequence and thus reconstructed into a volume EM dataset. The increased volume available in these methods has expanded the capability of electron microscopy to address new questions, such as mapping neural connectivity in the brain, and membrane contact sites between organelles.
