= Zarr =

Zarr may refer to:

- Zar, Armenia – village in Kotayk, Armenia
- Zarr (surname)
- Zarr (data format)
