= Cellomics =

An example of cellomics software interface.

Cellomics is the discipline of quantitative cell analysis using bioimaging methods and informatics with a workflow involving three major components: image acquisition, image analysis, and data visualization and management. These processes are generally automated. All three of these components depend on sophisticated software to acquire qualitative data, quantitative data, and the management of both images and data, respectively. Cellomics is also a trademarked term, which is often used interchangeably with high-content analysis (HCA) or high-content screening (HCS), but cellomics extends beyond HCA/HCS by incorporating sophisticated informatics tools.

== History ==
HCS and the discipline of cellomics was pioneered by a once privately held company named Cellomics Inc., which commercialized instruments, software, and reagents to facilitate the study of cells in culture, and more specifically, their responses to potentially therapeutic drug-like molecules. In 2005, Cellomics was acquired by Fisher Scientific International, Inc., now Thermo Fisher Scientific, which develops cellomics-related products under its high content analysis product line.

== Applications ==
Like many of the -omics, e.g., genomics and proteomics, applications have grown in depth and breadth over time. Currently there are over 40 different application areas that cellomics is used in, including the analysis of 3-D cell models, angiogenesis, and cell-signalling. Originally a tool used by the pharmaceutical industry for screening, cellomics has now expanded into academia to better understand cell function in the context of the cell. Cellomics is used in both academic and industrial life-science research in areas, such as cancer research, neuroscience research, drug discovery, consumer products safety, and toxicology; however, there are many more areas for which cellomics could provide a much deeper understanding of cellular function.

== Image analysis ==
With HCA at its core, cellomics incorporates the flexibility of fluorescence microscopy, the automation and capacity of the plate reader, and flow cytometry’s multi-parametric analysis in order to extract data from single-cells or from a population of cells.

Once an image is acquired using high content technology hardware, cell data is extracted from that image using image analysis software. Single cell data or population data may be of interest, but for both, a series of steps is followed with varying degrees of user interaction depending on the application and the software being used. The first step is segmenting the cells in the image which provides the software algorithms with the information it needs for downstream processing of individual cell measurements. Next, a user must define the area(s) of interest based on a multitude of parameters, i.e., the area a user wants to measure. After the area of interest has been defined, measurements are collected. The measurements, oftentimes referred to as features, are dictated by the type of data desired from the sample. There are many mathematical algorithms powering all of these steps, and each image analysis software package provides its own level of openness to the mathematical algorithms being used.

== Data management ==
Large numbers of images and amounts of data need to be managed when doing cellomics research. Data and image volumes can quickly range from 11MB to 1TB in less than a year, which is why cellomics uses the power of informatics to collect, organize, and archive all of this information. Secure and effective data mining requires the associated metadata to be captured and integrated into the data management model. Due to the critical nature of cellomics data management, implementing cellomics studies often requires inter-departmental cooperation between information technology and the life science research group leading the study.
