= Virtual microscopy =

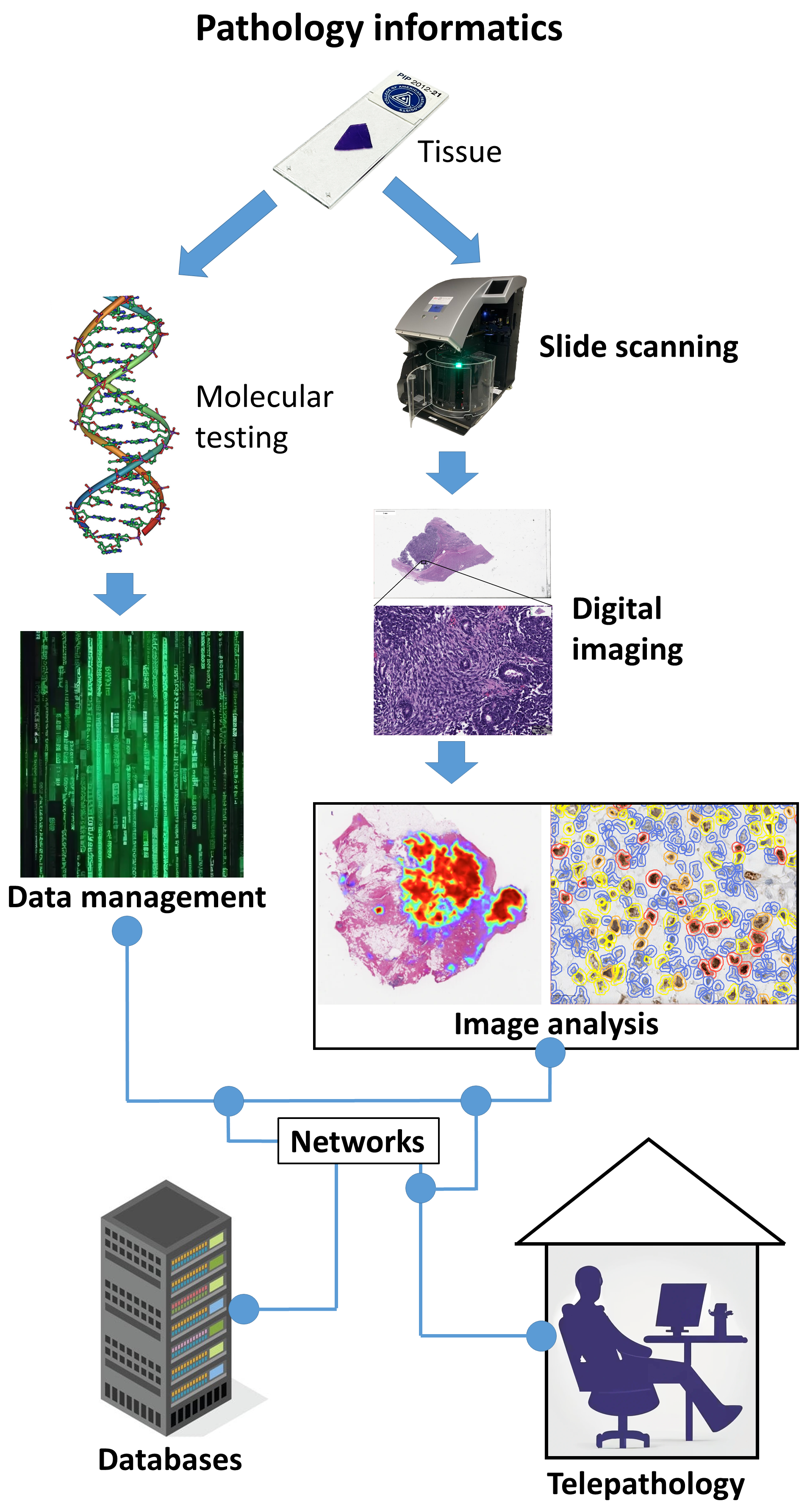
Major topics of pathology informatics, with major topics that underlie virtual microscopy, including slide scanning, digital imaging and networks.

Virtual microscopy is a method of posting microscope images on, and transmitting them over, computer networks. This allows independent viewing of images by large numbers of people in diverse locations. It involves a synthesis of microscopy technologies and digital technologies. The use of virtual microscopes can transform traditional teaching methods by removing the reliance on physical space, equipment, and specimens to a model that is solely dependent upon computer-internet access. This increases the convenience of accessing the slide sets and making the slides available to a broader audience. Digitized slides can have a high resolution and are resistant to being damaged or broken over time.

Prior to recent advances in virtual microscopy, slides were commonly digitized by various forms of film scanner and image resolutions rarely exceeded 5000 dpi. Nowadays, it is possible to achieve more than 100,000 dpi and thus resolutions approaching that visible under the optical microscope. This increase in scanning resolution comes at a price; whereas a typical flatbed or film scanner ranges in cost from $200 to $600, a 100,000 dpi slide scanner will range from $80,000 to $200,000.

== See also ==
- Digital pathology
- Microscopy
- Telepathology
- Tissue Cytometry, a technique that brings the concept of flow cytometry to tissue section, in situ, and helps to perform whole slide scanning and quantification of markers by maintaining the spatial context.
