= Tissue cytometry =

Digital Pathology

Tissue image cytometry or tissue cytometry is a method of digital histopathology and combines classical digital pathology (glass slides scanning and virtual slide generation) and computational pathology (digital analysis) into one integrated approach with solutions for all kinds of diseases, tissue and cell types as well as molecular markers and corresponding staining methods to visualize these markers. Tissue cytometry uses virtual slides as they can be generated by multiple, commercially available slide scanners, as well as dedicated image analysis software – preferentially including machine and deep learning algorithms. Tissue cytometry enables cellular analysis within thick tissues, retaining morphological and contextual information, including spatial information on defined cellular subpopulations.

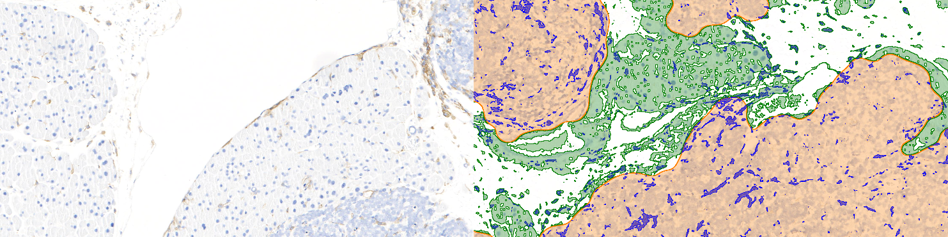
Phenotypic and functional analysis of molecules, cells, morphological tissue entities within their native tissue environment using digitized slides; it includes the measurement of areas, intensities, percentages and multiple other parameters.

In this process, a tissue sample, either formalin-fixed paraffin-embedded (FFPE) or frozen tissue section, also referred to as "cryocut", is labelled with either immunohistochemistry(IHC) or immunofluorescent markers, scanned with high-throughput slide scanners and the data gathered from virtual slides is processed and analyzed using software that is able to identify individual cells in tissue context automatically and distinguish between nucleus and cytoplasm for each cell. Additional algorithms can identify cellular membranes, subcellular structures (like cytoskeletal fibers, vacuoles, nucleoli) and/or multicellular tissue structures (glands, glomeruli, epidermis, or tumor foci).Fluorescence Activated Cell Sorting (FACS) is a method of analysis that measures fluorescence signals on single cells, where the signal comes from antibody-mediated staining techniques and phenotypes detected by flow cytometry. The major limitation of flow cytometry is that it can only be applied – as the name suggest – to cells in solution. Although methods of "solubilizing" solid tissue exist, any such processing irrevocably destroys the tissue architecture and any spatial context. Hence, tissue cytometry complements the use of flow cytometry and fluorescence microscope in basic research, clinical practice, and clinical trials by providing FACS-like analyses on solid tissue sections (as well as adherent cell cultures) in situ. The advantage of tissue cytometry against flow cytometry is that tissue cytometry does not require the cells to be suspended in fluid, aiding in maintaining the integrity of the tissue structure, morphology, and contextual information, further assisting in precise and accurate contextual analysis that are not possible in flow cytometry.

== History ==
Immunohistochemistry is used in clinical practice, where tissue biopsies from every potential cancer patient are collected, fixed in formalin and embedded on paraffin. These tissue sections are serially cut in a microtome to provide thin sections, representing the diagnostic material for clinical diagnoses. Once stained initially with hematoxylin and eosin stain to detect cancer cells. Multiple marker staining is performed for proliferation, lineage, prognostic and oncogenic targets. Pathologists used optical microscope for the evaluation through the objective lenses and conclude the diagnosis by scoring the staining in percentage or as positive/negative. Visual evaluation provides a subjective diagnosis and plan of treatment.

By converting glass slides into digital images, digital pathology changed how pathologists interacted with tissue specimens. However, the initial phase of digital pathology primarily focused on image viewing and sharing. While this enabled remote consultations and facilitated image archiving, it did not fundamentally alter the core process of pathology: the manual interpretation of tissue morphology by human experts.

A more robust and automated system was designed to perform flow cytometry-like analyses on immunostained cells in a fixed tissue and termed tissue cytometry. The technique was introduced in the 1990s based on patents by Steiner and Ecker, describing a procedure for "Cytometric Analysis of Diverse Cell Populations in Tissue Sections or Cell Culture Visualized Through Fluorescence Dyes and/or Chromogens". Tissue cytometry emerged as a transformative extension of digital pathology, promising to bridge the gap between image-based analysis and quantitative, data-driven insights. At its core, tissue cytometry enables the automated and quantitative analysis of cellular and tissue features. By employing computational algorithms and machine learning models, it can accurately segment nuclei, identify cell types, and quantify protein expression levels within the tissue context.

Additional patents were filed in the early 21st century by Hernani et al. to perform virtual flow cytometry on immunostained tissue. The latter's basics were derived from the procedure presented in 1982 by Gillete et al., describing the qualitative analysis of spectral mixtures by using factor analysis in conjunction with a spectral reference library. Following this study, Zhou R et al. published a method to quantify prostate-specific acid phosphatase (PSAP) in histologic sections of prostate tumor with the peroxidase-antiperoxidase (PAP) complex technique using diaminobenzidine (DAB) as a substrate.

The integration of AI and machine learning has been instrumental in the development of tissue cytometry. For instance, AI-driven algorithms can be trained to identify specific cell types, detect subtle morphological changes associated with disease, or quantify the density of immune cells within a tumor microenvironment.

By precisely delineating individual nuclei, researchers can extract valuable information about nuclear size, shape, and texture, which can be correlated with various pathological conditions. Similarly, tissue segmentation algorithms enable the identification of different tissue compartments, such as tumor, stroma, and immune infiltrate, facilitating the analysis of spatial relationships between cellular components.

== Tissue Cytometers ==
A tissue cytometer has two main components: (I) a high-throughput scanner to acquire the high-quality virtual image of immunohistochemical and/or fluorescent marker labelled tissue sections, (II) software for image analysis and data interpretation. Modern tissue cytometers can analyze many thousands of cells within the tissue sample in "real time".

== Applications of Tissue cytometry ==
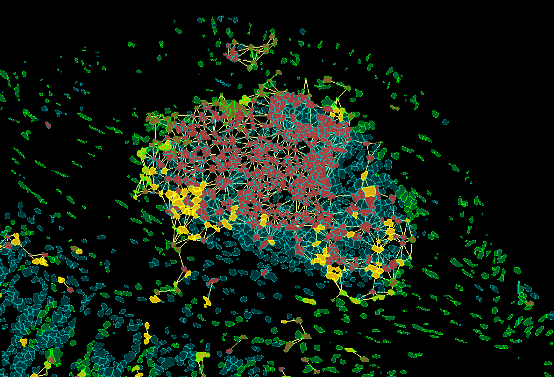
Tissue cytometry assists in performing phenotypic characterization of cellular sub-populations in spatial context.

Tumor Microenvironment: Tissue cytometry is heavily used in research to characterize the tumor microenvironment including e.g. identification of the immune landscape or tumor-vascularization, within IHC/IF-processed tissue sections. One reason is that by using this technology the complex tissue architecture stays intact and therefore also spatial relationships between cellular phenotypes and/or multicellular structures can be analyzed.

By utilizing tissue cytometry multiple research groups were able to demonstrate the impact of various immune cell subpopulations (CD4, CD68, CD8, CD20, Foxp3, PD1) on patient survival in different cancer types (e.g. breast cancer, colon cancer, gastric cancer, melanoma, non-small cell lung cancer). Since in cancer therapy a novel treatment strategy is targeting immune checkpoints (molecules that inhibit the antitumoral immune reaction), the insights gained by tissue cytometry may help to find new target molecules/biomarkers as well as to determine the best treatment strategy for patients.

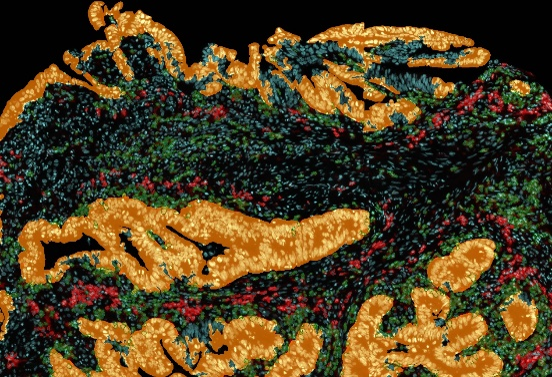
Image analysis output of a colon tissue section with classified structures: crypts and stroma. Cells of various phenotypes labelled in colored masks are segmented.

Immunology: Immune cell context is important for delineating the etymology of inflammatory diseases, which often result from impaired function of adaptive and/or innate immune cells. Tissue cytometry is useful for detecting and localizing specific cells, especially heterogeneous populations, within their native tissue environment and identifying the cues behind the disease. For example, it was used to investigate IgG4-related diseases: one paper reports about fibrosing mediastinitis being driven by CD4+ CTLs rather than Th2 cells where infiltration of CD4+ CTLs was illustrated by tissue cytometry. Follow-up studies investigated how follicular T cells influence B-cell class-switching events in IgG4-related disease and Kimura disease – researchers found a correlation between AICDA+CD19+ B cells and IgG4 expression using tissue cytometry.

Mesenchymal Stem Cells Characterization: Mesenchymal stem cells (MSCs) are multipotent cells that have the capacity differentiate into several sub-types such as bone, cartilage, muscle, developing teeth and fat tissue which has clinical importance for regenerative medicine. However, although there are defined minimal phenotypic criteria, MSCs due to their heterogeneous nature need to be further characterized regarding their distinct biomarkers. Tissue cytometry promisingly assists to describe the biomarkers of quiescent MCSs and furthermore characterize the effect of hyaluronan on this population. Tissue cytometry can also used to investigate MSCs interaction with glioblastoma: to characterize cell fusion, extracellular vesicle transfer and intercellular communications. Additionally, tissue cytometry is utilized to image the murine hippocampus and visualize M1/M2 microglia in mice with MSCs transplantation as a model for Alzheimer's disease.

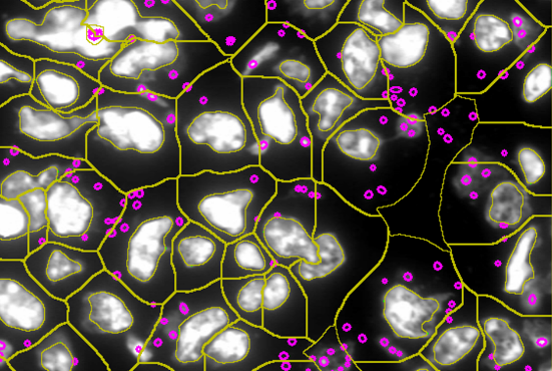
Tissue cytometry provides applications to quantify cellular pathogens including intracellular parasites (e.g. leishmania) and viral load (e.g. SARS-CoV-2, Influenza, HIV, Zika, Dengue, Hepatitis, HSV, Chikungunya).

COVID-19: COVID-19 pandemic required various tools to outline the disease progression and severity. Using tissue cytometry, researchers reported about interplay of immune cells and SARS-CoV-2 virus and its effect on disease: for instance, one study showed that CD4+ cytotoxic T cells expanded significantly in the lungs in severe COVID-19. Another finding illustrates loss of germinal centers in lymph nodes and spleens in acute COVID-19, which was shown by multi-color immunofluorescence cytometry.

Neuroscience: Tracking neurodevelopmental processes is an active field of research in neuroscience. Quantitative tissue analysis is widely employed in the field to determine the role of different stimuli in the nervous system. A research group reported about the effect of the magnetic field on neural differentiation of pluripotent stem cells, where the phenotypic effects were observed using tissue cytometry. Another application of tissue cytometry in neuroscience was shown in a study designed to evaluate the effect of stress on hypothalamic neurons.
