= Wellcome Leap =

Nonprofit health research organization

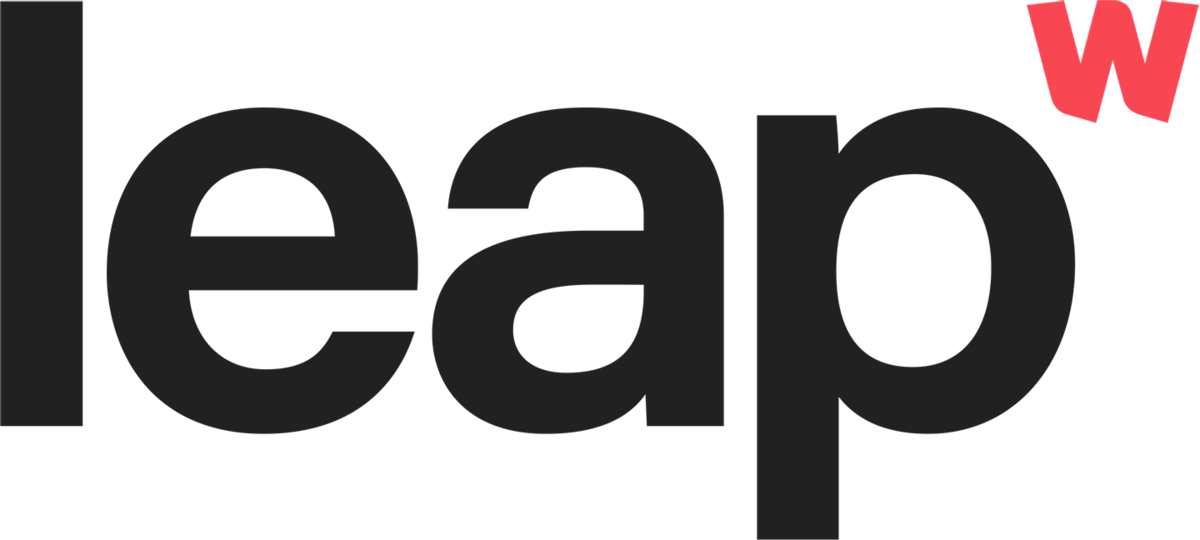
- Formation: 2020; 6 years ago
- Founder: Wellcome Trust
- Type: 501(c)(3) nonprofit
- Location: United States
- Key people: Regina E. Dugan (CEO); Jay Flatley (Chairman)
- Website: wellcomeleap.org

Wellcome Leap is a nonprofit organization that funds health research programs. It was established in 2020 by the Wellcome Trust, a UK-based charitable foundation, with initial funding of US$300 million. The organization's model is based on the U.S. Defense Advanced Research Projects Agency (DARPA) model, designed to deliver results in three-year, milestone-driven programs. As of 2025, the organization launched 12 programs across 30 countries, supported by over 160 institutions, nonprofits, and companies.

== History ==
The Wellcome Trust announced the creation of a £250 million fund in 2018 to support high-risk health research projects. The initiative was set up as a subsidiary of the Wellcome Trust with an independent board. Wellcome Leap was formally launched in May 2020 with Regina E. Dugan, former director of DARPA, as CEO and Jay Flatley, former CEO of Illumina, Inc., as chairman.

In February 2022, the Wellcome Trust provided an additional US$335 million in funding, bringing the organization's total funding to over US$635 million.

In April 2023, Wellcome Leap partnered with Temasek Trust to launch a US$60 million program focused on aging and health.

In September 2025, the organization announced a US$100 million partnership with Pivotal Ventures, founded by Melinda French Gates, to fund women's health research. The new funding will launch two programs in 2026, expanding Wellcome Leap's total women's health investment to $250 million.

== Structure and approach ==
The organization funds time-limited research programs, typically lasting three years, with defined goals and milestones. Researchers work from their home institutions rather than a central facility.

The organization has established a network of research institutions that have signed a standard funding agreement intended to reduce administrative delays in starting projects. As of 2025, Wellcome Leap launched 12 programs across 30 countries, supported by over 160 institutions, nonprofits, and companies. As of 2025, Wellcome Leap has created the largest, most rapidly 'activatable' health research network in the world, with around 150 world-class institutions, non-profits and commercial entities representing a network of over 1.5M scientists and engineers across six continents.

== Leadership ==
Regina E. Dugan serves as CEO. She previously served as the 19th director of DARPA from 2009 to 2012, becoming the first woman to lead that agency. She subsequently held executive positions at Google and Facebook.

Jay Flatley serves as chairman. He was previously CEO of Illumina, Inc., a genomics company.
