= Zarr (surname) =

Zarr is a surname. Notable people with the surname include:

- Fred Zarr (born 1955), American musician, songwriter, keyboardist and record producer
- Sara Zarr (born 1970), American writer

== See also ==
- Barr (surname)
- Carr (surname)
- Zar (disambiguation)
