= Bioimaging =

Bioimaging, the imaging of biological materials, may refer to:

- medical imaging
- microscopy
- nanoprobe (device)
