= Leica Biosystems =

German scientific instruments manufacturer

- Company type: Subsidiary GmbH
- Industry: Biotechnology, Digital pathology
- Founded: 1872, as Precision Engineering
- Headquarters: Nussloch, Germany
- Products: Microtome; Cryostat; Vibratome, Digital Pathology Scanner
- Parent: Danaher Corporation
- Website: leicabiosystems.com

Leica Biosystems, founded 1872 as Precision Engineering, is a medical device company that develops and supplies clinical diagnostics to the pathology market. It is also a research, instrument, and medical device company and a division of Danaher Corporation.

== Company Description ==
The company is headquartered in Germany, with operations in the United Kingdom, Netherlands, Australia, India, China, Singapore, Mexico, and the United States (California, Illinois, and Ohio). A research and development facility concentrating on companion diagnostics for cancer drugs has been in operation in Danvers, Massachusetts since August 2012.

The Massachusetts facility has partnered with Galena Biopharma to develop companion diagnostics for a breast cancer vaccine.

In 2024, Leica Biosystems announced the relocation of its Companion Diagnostics and Advanced Assays business to Newcastle, United Kingdom.

In November 2022, the company announced its acquisition of Cell IDx Inc, headquartered in San Diego, California, and provides multiplex staining panels, tissue staining, and imaging and analysis services.

Leica Biosystems acquired Aperio, an ePathology solutions company, in October 2012. In October 2014, the company announced they will purchase Devicor Medical Products, which is headquartered in Cincinnati and makes medical devices used in breast biopsies.

The company partners with Mayo Clinic’s Department of Laboratory Medicine and Pathology in developing cytogenetics imaging software.

== See also ==
- Wild Heerbrugg
- Heinrich Wild
