= High-content screening =

High-content screening (HCS), also known as high-content analysis (HCA) or cellomics, is a method that is used in biological research and drug discovery to identify substances such as small molecules, peptides, or RNAi that alter the phenotype of a cell in a desired manner. Hence high content screening is a type of phenotypic screen conducted in cells involving the analysis of whole cells or components of cells with simultaneous readout of several parameters. HCS is related to high-throughput screening (HTS), in which thousands of compounds are tested in parallel for their activity in one or more biological assays, but involves assays of more complex cellular phenotypes as outputs. Phenotypic changes may include increases or decreases in the production of cellular products such as proteins and/or changes in the morphology (visual appearance) of the cell. Hence HCA typically involves automated microscopy and image analysis. Unlike high-content analysis, high-content screening implies a level of throughput which is why the term "screening" differentiates HCS from HCA, which may be high in content but low in throughput.

In high content screening, cells are first incubated with the substance and after a period of time, structures and molecular components of the cells are analyzed. The most common analysis involves labeling proteins with fluorescent tags, and finally changes in cell phenotype are measured using automated image analysis. Through the use of fluorescent tags with different absorption and emission maxima, it is possible to measure several different cell components in parallel. Furthermore, the imaging is able to detect changes at a subcellular level (e.g., cytoplasm vs. nucleus vs. other organelles). Therefore, a large number of data points can be collected per cell. In addition to fluorescent labeling, various label free assays have been used in high content screening.

== General principles ==
One of the applications of HCS is the discovery of new drug candidates

High-content screening (HCS) in cell-based systems uses living cells as tools in biological research to elucidate the workings of normal and diseased cells. HCS is also used to discover and optimize new drug candidates. High content screening is a combination of modern cell biology, with all its molecular tools, with automated high resolution microscopy and robotic handling. Cells are first exposed to chemicals or RNAi reagents. Changes in cell morphology are then detected using image analysis. Changes in the amounts of proteins synthesized by cells are measured using a variety of techniques such as the green fluorescent proteins fused to endogenous proteins, or by fluorescent antibodies.

The technology may be used to determine whether a potential drug is disease modifying. For example, in humans G-protein coupled receptors (GPCRs) are a large family of around 880 cell surface proteins that transduce extra-cellular changes in the environment into a cell response, like triggering an increase in blood pressure because of the release of a regulatory hormone into the blood stream. Activation of these GPCRs can involve their entry into cells and when this can be visualised it can be the basis of a systematic analysis of receptor function through chemical genetics, systematic genome wide screening or physiological manipulation.

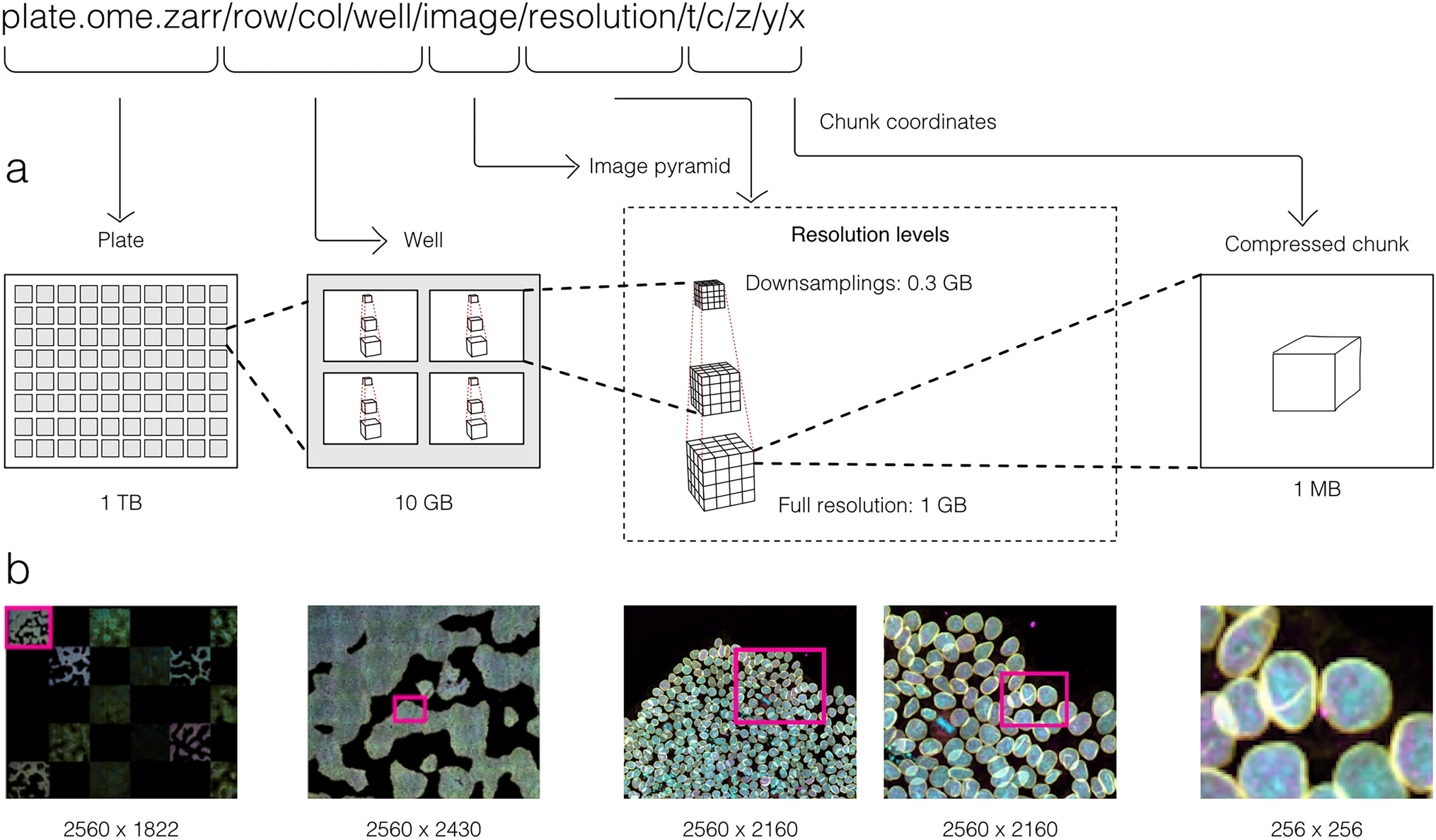
Advanced pipelines are often needed to manage the data generated by HCS, which includes multiple images over multiple wells in a plate.

At a cellular level, parallel acquisition of data on different cell properties, for example activity of signal transduction cascades and cytoskeleton integrity is the main advantage of this method in comparison to the faster but less detailed high throughput screening. While HCS is slower, the wealth of acquired data allows a more profound understanding of drug effects.

Automated image based screening permits the identification of small compounds altering cellular phenotypes and is of interest for the discovery of new pharmaceuticals and new cell biological tools for modifying cell function. The selection of molecules based on a cellular phenotype does not require a prior knowledge of the biochemical targets that are affected by compounds. However the identification of the biological target will make subsequent preclinical optimization and clinical development of the compound hit significantly easier. Given the increase in the use of phenotypic/visual screening as a cell biological tool, methods are required that permit systematic biochemical target identification if these molecules are to be of broad use. Target identification has been defined as the rate limiting step in chemical genetics/high-content screening.

== Instrumentation ==
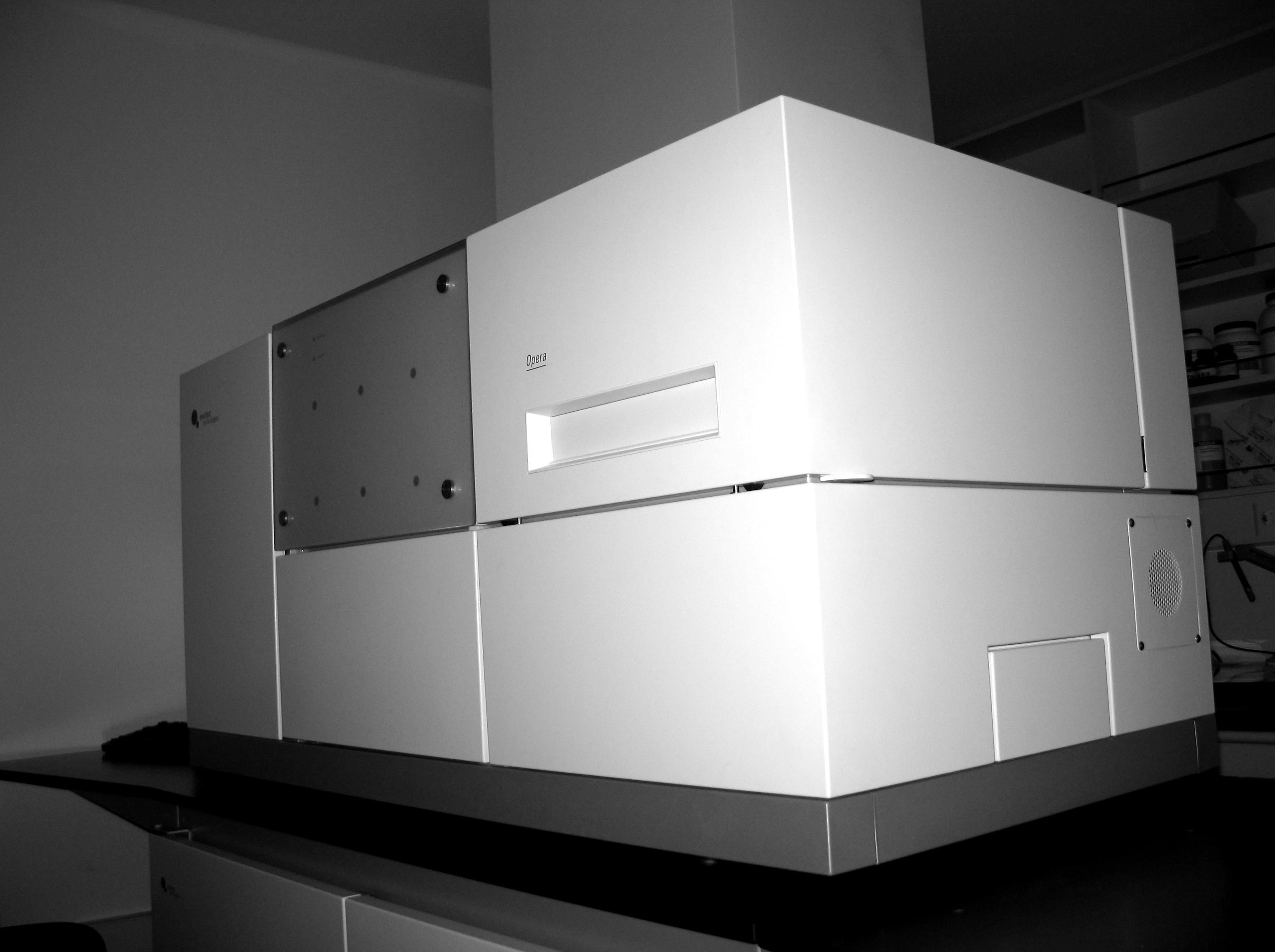
An automated confocal image reader

High-content screening technology is mainly based on automated digital microscopy and flow cytometry, in combination with IT-systems for the analysis and storage of the data.

“High-content” or visual biology technology has two purposes, first to acquire spatially or temporally resolved information on an event and second to automatically quantify it. Spatially resolved instruments are typically automated microscopes, and temporal resolution still requires some form of fluorescence measurement in most cases. This means that a lot of HCS instruments are (fluorescence) microscopes that are connected to some form of image analysis package. These take care of all the steps in taking fluorescent images of cells and provide rapid, automated and unbiased assessment of experiments.

HCS instruments on the market today can be separated based on an array of specifications that significantly influence the instruments versatility and overall cost. These include speed, a live cell chamber that includes temperature and CO_{2} control (some also have humidity control for longer term live cell imaging), a built in pipettor or injector for fast kinetic assays, and additional imaging modes such as confocal, bright field, phase contrast and FRET. One of the most incisive difference is whether the instruments are optical confocal or not. Confocal microscopy summarizes as imaging/resolving a thin slice through an object and rejecting out of focus light that comes from outside this slice. Confocal imaging enables higher image signal to noise and higher resolution than the more commonly applied epi-fluorescence microscopy. Depending on the instrument confocality is achieved via laser scanning, a single spinning disk with pinholes or slits, a dual spinning disk, or a virtual slit. There are trade offs of sensitivity, resolution, speed, photo-toxicity, photo-bleaching, instrument complexity, and price between these various confocal techniques.

What all instruments share is the ability to take, store and interpret images automatically and integrate into large robotic cell/medium handling platforms.

== Software ==
Many screens are analyzed using the image analysis software that accompanies the instrument, providing a turn-key solution. Third-party software alternatives are often used for particularly challenging screens or where a laboratory or facility has multiple instruments and wishes to standardize to a single analysis platform. Some instrument software provides bulk importing and exporting of images and data, for users who want to do such standardization on a single analysis platform without the use of third-party software, however.

== Applications ==
This technology allows a (very) large number of experiments to be performed, allowing explorative screening. Cell-based systems are mainly used in chemical genetics where large, diverse small molecule collections are systematically tested for their effect on cellular model systems. Novel drugs can be found using screens of tens of thousands of molecules, and these have promise for the future of drug development.

Beyond drug discovery, chemical genetics is aimed at functionalizing the genome by identifying small molecules that acts on most of the 21,000 gene products in a cell. High-content technology will be part of this effort which could provide useful tools for learning where and when proteins act by knocking them out chemically. This would be most useful for gene where knock out mice (missing one or several genes) can not be made because the protein is required for development, growth or otherwise lethal when it is not there. Chemical knock out could address how and where these genes work.

Further the technology is used in combination with RNAi to identify sets of genes involved in specific mechanisms, for example cell division. Here, libraries of RNAis, covering a whole set of predicted genes inside the target organism's genome can be used to identify relevant subsets, facilitating the annotation of genes for which no clear role has been established beforehand.

The large datasets produced by automated cell biology contain spatially resolved, quantitative data which can be used for building for systems level models and simulations of how cells and organisms function. Systems biology models of cell function would permit prediction of why, where and how the cell responds to external changes, growth and disease.

== History ==
High-content screening technology allows for the evaluation of multiple biochemical and morphological parameters in intact biological systems.

For cell-based approaches the utility of automated cell biology requires an examination of how automation and objective measurement can improve the experimentation and the understanding of disease. First, it removes the influence of the investigator in most, but not all, aspects of cell biology research and second it makes entirely new approaches possible.

In review, classical 20th century cell biology used cell lines grown in culture where the experiments were measured using very similar to that described here, but there the investigator made the choice on what was measured and how. In the early 1990s, the development of charge-coupled device (CCD) cameras for research created the opportunity to measure features in pictures of cells- such as how much protein is in the nucleus, how much is outside. Sophisticated measurements soon followed using new fluorescent molecules, which are used to measure cell properties like second messenger concentrations or the pH of internal cell compartments. The wide use of the green fluorescent protein, a natural fluorescent protein molecule from jellyfish, then accelerated the trend toward cell imaging as a mainstream technology in cell biology. Despite these advances, the choice of which cell to image and which data to present and how to analyze it was still selected by the investigator.

By analogy, if one imagines a football field and dinner plates laid across it, instead of looking at all of them, the investigator would choose a handful near the score line and had to leave the rest. In this analogy the field is a tissue culture dish, the plates the cells growing on it. While this was a reasonable and pragmatic approach automation of the whole process and the analysis makes possible the analysis of the whole population of living cells, so the whole football field can be measured.

== See also ==
- Drug discovery
- High-throughput screening
- Drug discovery hit to lead
- Microscopy
- Flow cytometry
- Live single-cell imaging
