= Recombinase polymerase amplification =

Alternative to the polymerase chain reaction

Recombinase polymerase amplification (RPA) is a single tube, isothermal alternative to the polymerase chain reaction (PCR). By adding a reverse transcriptase enzyme to an RPA reaction, it can detect RNA as well as DNA, without the need for a separate step to produce cDNA. Because it is isothermal, RPA can use much simpler equipment than PCR, which requires a thermal cycler. Operating best at temperatures of 37–42 °C and still working, albeit more slowly, at room temperature means RPA reactions can in theory be run quickly by simply holding a tube in the hand. This makes RPA an excellent candidate for developing low-cost, rapid, point-of-care molecular tests. An international quality assessment of molecular detection of Rift Valley fever virus performed as well as the best RT-PCR tests, detecting less concentrated samples missed by some PCR tests and an RT-LAMP test. RPA was developed and launched by TwistDx Ltd. (formerly known as ASM Scientific Ltd), a biotechnology company based in Cambridge, UK.

== Technique ==
The RPA process employs three core enzymes – a recombinase, a single-stranded DNA-binding protein (SSB) and strand-displacing polymerase. Recombinases are capable of pairing oligonucleotide primers with homologous sequence in duplex DNA, SSB bind to displaced strands of DNA and prevent the primers from being displaced, and the strand displacing polymerase begins DNA synthesis where the primer has bound to the target DNA.

By using two opposing primers, much like PCR, if the target sequence is indeed present, an exponential DNA amplification reaction is initiated. No other sample manipulation such as thermal or chemical melting is required to initiate amplification. At optimal temperatures (37–42 °C), the reaction progresses rapidly and results in specific DNA amplification from just a few target copies to detectable levels, typically within 10 minutes, for rapid detection of viral genomic DNA or RNA, pathogenic bacterial genomic DNA, as well as short length aptamer DNA.

The three core RPA enzymes can be supplemented by further enzymes to provide extra functionality. Addition of exonuclease III allows the use of an exo probe for real-time, fluorescence detection akin to real-time PCR. Addition of endonuclease IV means that an nfo probe can be used for lateral flow strip detection of successful amplification. If a reverse transcriptase that works at 37–42 °C is added then RNA can be reverse transcribed and the cDNA produced amplified all in one step. Currently only the TwistAmp exo version of RPA is available with the reverse transcriptase included, although users can simply supplement other TwistAmp reactions with a reverse transcriptase to produce the same effect. As with PCR, all forms of RPA reactions can be multiplexed by the addition of further primer/probe pairs, allowing the detection of multiple analytes or an internal control in the same tube.

== Relationship to other amplification techniques ==
RPA is one of several isothermal nucleic acid amplification techniques to be developed as a molecular diagnostic technique, frequently with the objective of simplifying the laboratory instrumentation required relative to PCR. A partial list of other isothermal amplification techniques include LAMP, NASBA, helicase-dependent amplification (HDA), and nicking enzyme amplification reaction (NEAR). The techniques differ in the specifics of primer design and reaction mechanism, and in some cases (like RPA) make use of cocktails of two or more enzymes. Like RPA, many of these techniques offer rapid amplification times with the potential for simplified instrumentation, and reported resistance to substances in unpurified samples that are known to inhibit PCR. With respect to amplification time, modern thermocyclers with rapid temperature ramps can reduce PCR amplification times to less than 30 minutes, particularly for short amplicons using dual-temperature cycling rather than the conventional three-temperature protocols. In addition, the demands of sample prep (including lysis and extraction of DNA or RNA, if necessary) should be considered as part of the overall time and complexity inherent to the technique. These requirements vary according to the technique as well as to the specific target and sample type.

Compared to PCR, the guidelines for primer and probe design for RPA are less established, and may take a certain degree of trial and error, although recent results indicate that standard PCR primers can work as well. The general principle of a discrete amplicon bounded by a forward and reverse primer with an (optional) internal fluorogenic probe is similar to PCR. PCR primers may be used directly in RPA, but their short length means that recombination rates are low and RPA will not be especially sensitive or fast. Typically 30–38 base primers are needed for efficient recombinase filament formation and RPA performance. This is in contrast to some other techniques such as LAMP which use a larger number of primers subject to additional design constraints. Although the original 2006 report of RPA describes a functional set of reaction components, the current (proprietary) formulation of the TwistAmp kit is "substantially different" and is available only from the TwistDx supplier. This is in comparison to reaction mixtures for PCR which are available from many suppliers, or LAMP or NASBA for which the composition of the reaction mixture is freely published, allowing researchers to create their own customized "kits" from inexpensive ingredients.

Published scientific literature generally lacks detailed comparison of the performance of isothermal amplification techniques such as RPA, HDA, and LAMP relative to each other, often rather comparing a single isothermal technique to a "gold standard" PCR assay. This makes it difficult to judge the merits of these techniques independently from the claims of the manufacturers, inventors, or proponents. Furthermore, performance characteristics of any amplification technique are difficult to decouple from primer design: a "good" primer set for one target for RPA may give faster amplification or more sensitive detection than a "poor" LAMP primer set for the same target, but the converse may be true for different primer sets for a different target. An exception is a recent study comparing RT-qPCR, RT-LAMP, and RPA for detection of Schmallenberg virus and bovine viral diarrhea virus, which effectively makes the point that each amplification technique has strengths and weaknesses, which may vary by the target, and that the properties of the available amplification techniques need to be evaluated in combination with the requirements for each application. As with PCR and any other amplification technique, there may be a publication bias, with poorly performing primer sets rarely deemed worthy of reporting.
