= Aminoallyl nucleotide =

Aminoallyl uridine (aa-UTP)

Aminoallyl nucleotide is a nucleotide with a modified base containing an allylamine. They are used in post-labeling of nucleic acids by fluorescence detection in microarray. They are reactive with N-Hydroxysuccinimide ester group which helps attach a fluorescent dye to the primary amino group on the nucleotide. These nucleotides are known as 5-(3-aminoallyl)-nucleotides since the aminoallyl group is usually attached to carbon 5 of the pyrimidine ring of uracil or cytosine. The primary amine group in the aminoallyl moiety is aliphatic and thus more reactive compared to the amine groups that are directly attached to the rings (aromatic) of the bases. Common names of aminoallyl nucleosides are initially abbreviated with aa- or AA- to indicate aminoallyl. The 5-carbon sugar is indicated with or without the lowercase "d" indicating deoxyribose if included or ribose if not. Finally the nitrogenous base and number of phosphates are indicated (i.e. aa-UTP = aminoallyl uridine triphosphate).

== History ==
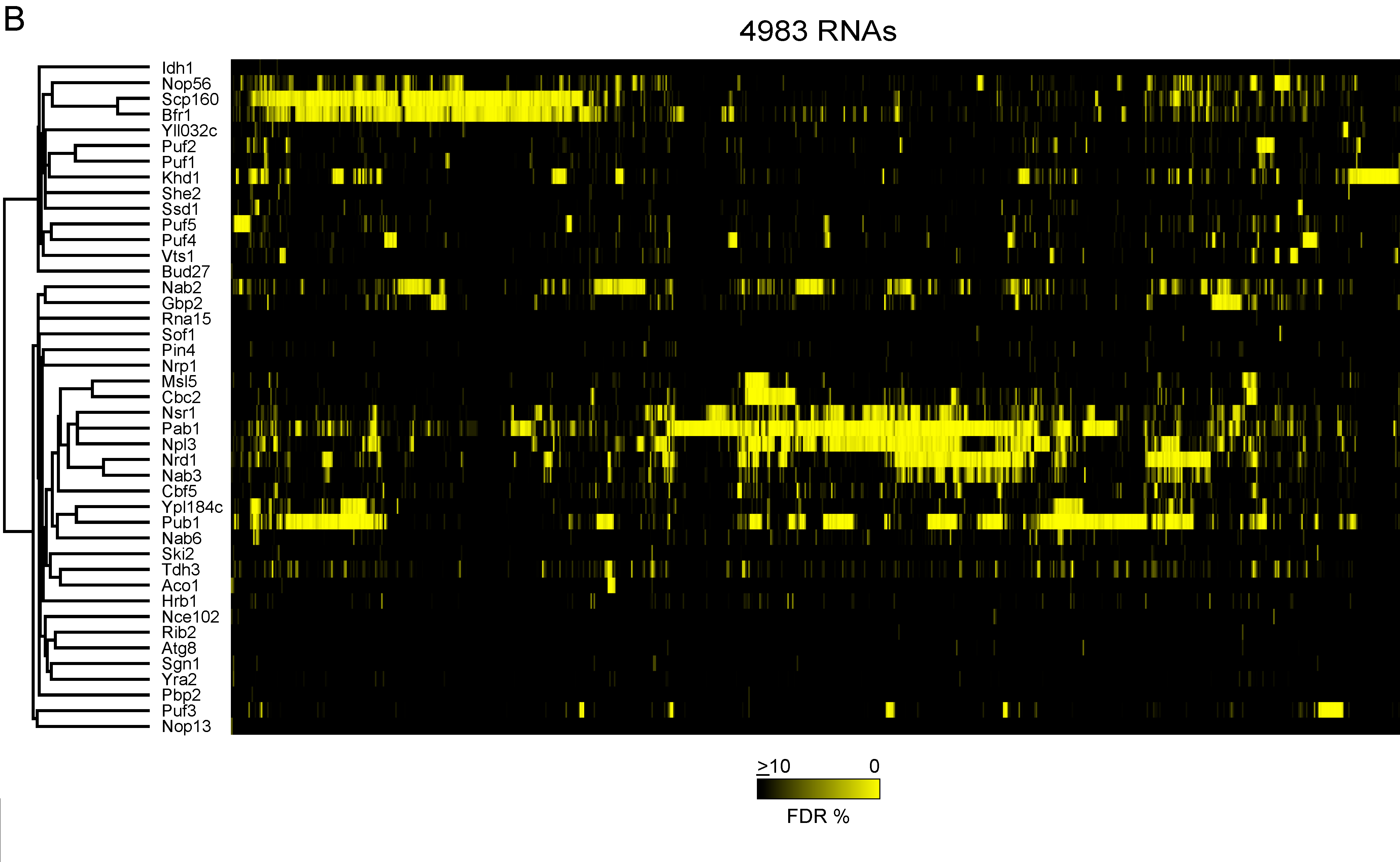
Hierarchically clustered heat map using aa-dUTPs

The goal of combining fluorescence and nucleic acids has been to provide a non-isotopic tag that is detectable to study DNA or RNA. This type of labeling allows scientists to study DNA or RNA in their structure, function, or formation with other nucleic acids. The first base modification for fluorescent labeling occurred in 1971 with a 4-thiouridine and 4-thiouracil. This research along with others, which included various types of direct and non-direct labeling via: analogs, addition via enzymes, or other methods made labeling of nucleotides much safer for scientist to study DNA.

As instrumentation and technologies become more advanced in the field of DNA microarray, better reagents and techniques will be needed to further scientific studies. Fluorescent labeling with Cy3 was shown to be more insufficient and skew results; the method of aminoallyl nucleotide incorporation was opted instead. Using aminoallyl nucleotides as indirect fluorescent labeling seemed to nullify the sensitivity issues seen in cyanine-labeling.

== Synthesis ==
Aminoallyl nucleosides can be synthesized via Heck coupling as shown in the image below.

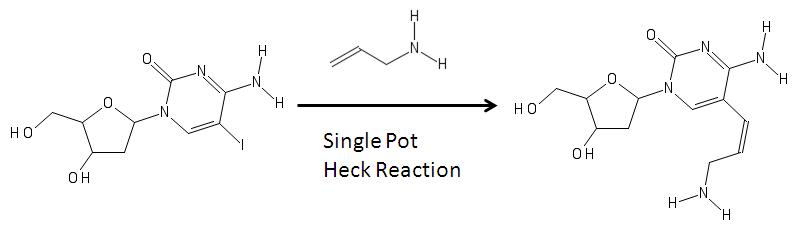

In the image above, on the left is a modified nucleoside with an iodine (the iodine is added via electrophilic halogenation) in the fifth carbon in the pyrimidine ring. Its formation can be associated with a reaction with an allylamine and various reagents via heck coupling are able to remove the halogen group from the base and add the allylamine to become the aminoallyl nucleoside shown on the right. The product on the right is then used to in molecular biology in RNA synthesis.

Other reactions include using a single pot synthesis with other halogens.

== Reaction ==
The primary amine on the aminoallyl nucleotide reacts with amino-reactive dyes such as a cyanine and patented dyes which contain a reactive leaving group, such as a succinimidyl ester (NHS).The amine groups directly attached to the ring of the base are not affected. These nucleotides are used for labeling DNA.

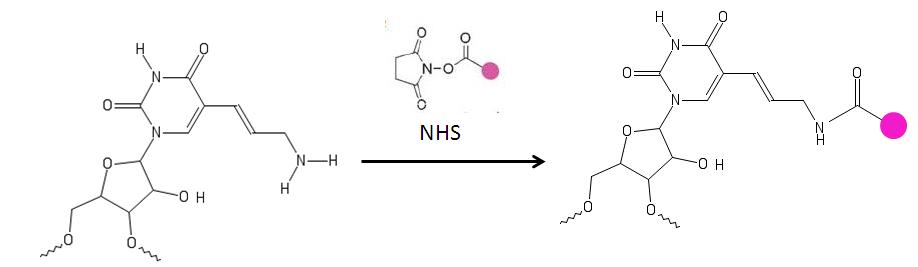

== Uses ==
Aminoallyl NTPs are used for indirect DNA labeling in PCR, nick translation, primer extensions and cDNA synthesis. These labeled NTPs are helpful because of their application in molecular biology labs where they do not have the capacity to handle radioactive material. For example, 5-(3-Aminoallyl)-Uridine(AA-UTPs) are more effective for high density labeling of DNA than pre-labeling the DNA. After the enzymatic addition of the NTPs, amine reactant fluorescent dyes can be added for detection of the DNA molecule. When incorporated into DNA or RNA molecules by DNA/RNA polymerase, 5-(3-aminoallyl)-UTP provide a reactive group for the addition of other chemical groups. Thus aminoallyl modified DNA or RNA can be labeled with any compound which has an amine-reactive group. aa-NTPs incorporated into DNA/RNA in combination with a secondary dye coupling reagents can probe for an array analysis.

cDNA relies on aminoallyl labeling for detection purposes. Although direct labeling of dNTP is the quickest and cheapest method of fluorescent labeling, it is disadvantageous as the sequence allows for only one modified nucleotide for use. Another disadvantage of direct labeling is the bulky nucleotides, however this can be overcome by indirect labeling using aminoallyl modified nucleotides. An easy way to check for labeling success is the color;Good labeling will result in visible blue (Cy5) or red (Cy3) color in the final material.

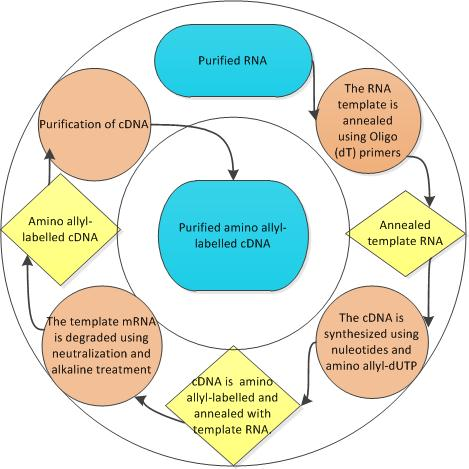
Process of preparing amino-allyl labeled cDNA

Another process which uses aminoallyl labeling is NASBA ( Nucleic Acid Sequence Based Amplification), a highly sensitive technique for amplifying RNA. In this specific case, the aaUTP modified RNAs were tagged with fluorescent market Cy3. NASBA combined with aminoallyl-UTP labeling is very useful for many different areas of microbial diagnostics including environmental monitoring, bio threat detection, industrial process monitoring and clinical microbiology. DNA microarray is another method which utilizes specifically AA-NTP's making DNA microarray testing quicker and cheaply.

Post-synthesis labeling avoids the problems found in direct enzymatic incorporation of Cy-labeled dNTPs by generating probes with equal labeling effectiveness. With indirect labeling, amine-modified NTPs are incorporated during reverse transcription, RNA amplification, or PCR. Amino allyl-NTPs are incorporated with similar efficiency as unmodified NTPs during polymerization.

Concerns with labeling: The amine group, in aminoallyl-modified nucleotide, is reactive with dyes such as the cyanine series, or other patented dyes. A problem arises when the dyes react with buffering agents which are necessary for the proper storage of the nucleotides. However, a carbonate buffer can be used to overcome this problem.

== See also ==
- NASBA
- PCR
- Nick Translation
- cDNA
- Microarray
- Fluorophore
- Reverse Transcription
