= Image SXM =

- Developer: Steve Barrett (University of Liverpool)
- Stable release: 2.02 / April 2018
- Operating system: (Mac OS, Mac OS X)
- Type: Image processing
- License: Freeware (no source code)
- Website: ImageSXM.org.uk

Image SXM is an image analysis software specialized for scanning microscope images. It is based on the public domain software NIH Image (now ImageJ from the National Institutes of Health) and has been extended to handle scanning microscope images, especially of the SxM formats (SAM, SCM, SEM, SFM, SLM, SNOM, SPM, STM), hence its name.

== Features ==
Image SXM supports image stacks, a series of images that share a single window. It can calculate area and pixel value statistics of user-defined selections and intensity thresholded objects. It can measure distances and angles. It can create density histograms and line profile plots. It supports standard image processing functions such as logical and arithmetical operations between images, contrast manipulation, convolution, Fourier analysis, sharpening, smoothing, edge detection and median filtering. It does geometric transformations such as image scaling, rotation and flips. The program supports any number of images simultaneously, limited only by available memory.

== History ==
Image SXM is based upon a similar freeware image analysis program known as NIH Image (that had been developed by the National Institutes of Health for Macintosh computers running pre-Mac OS X operating systems), now become ImageJ.

== See also ==
- Microscope image processing
