= Anne E. Carpenter =

American scientist

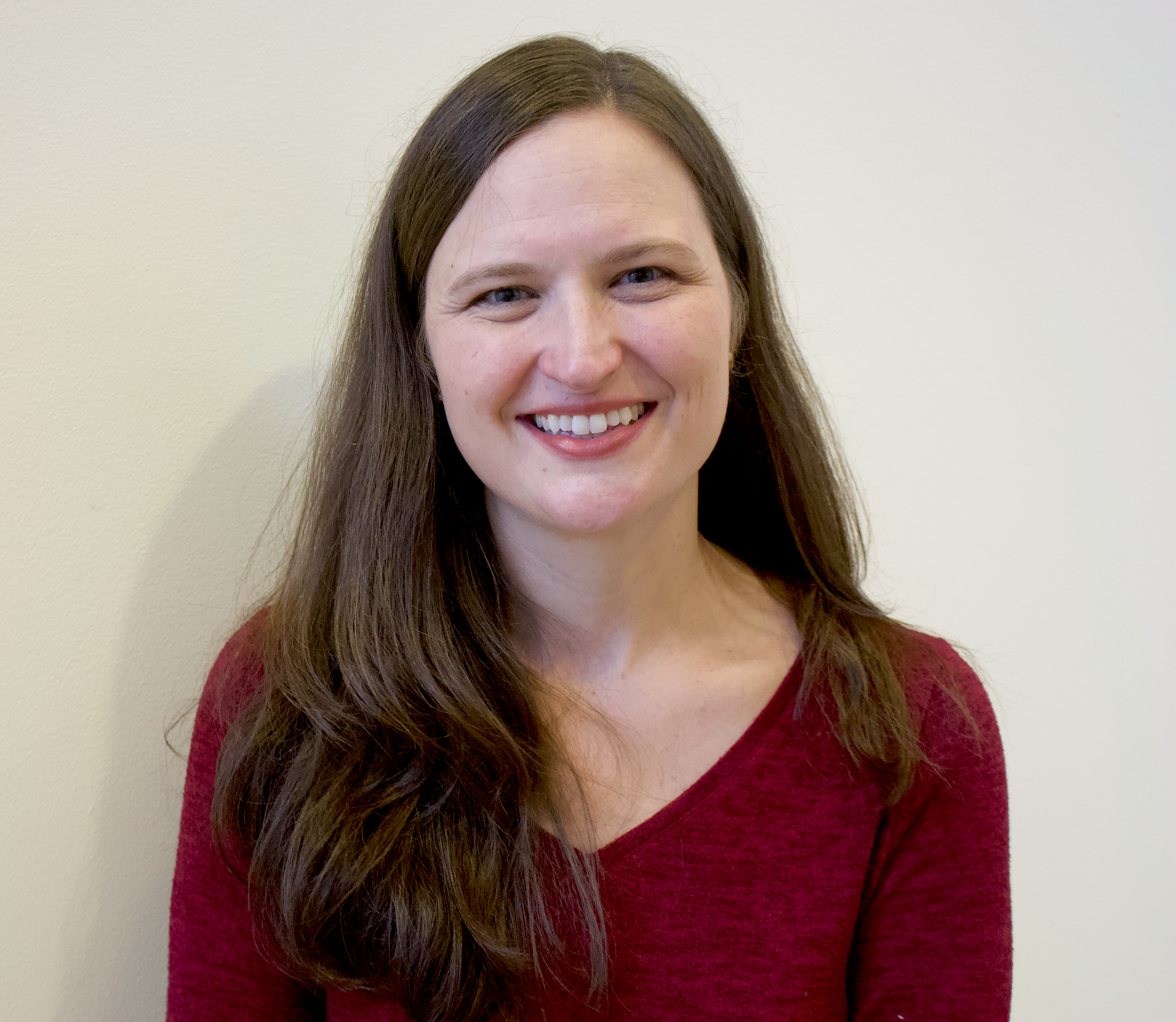
- Self-portrait photograph
- Born: August 8, 1976 (age 50); Kalamazoo, Michigan, United States
- Education: Purdue University, BSc; University of Illinois Urbana-Champaign, PhD
- Scientific career
- Fields: Cell Biology, microscopy, computational biology, artificial intelligence, drug discovery
- Workplaces: Purdue University, Broad Institute
- Academic advisors: David M. Sabatini
- Website: broadinstitute.org

Anne E. Carpenter is an American scientist in the field of image analysis for cell biology and artificial intelligence for drug discovery. She is the co-creator of CellProfiler, open-source software for high-throughput biological image analysis, and a co-inventor of the Cell Painting assay, a method for image-based profiling. She is an Institute Scientist and Senior Director of the Imaging Platform at the Broad Institute and a professor in the Departments of Biological Sciences and Computer Science in the Institute of Physical AI.

== Education and early career ==
=== Undergraduate training ===
Carpenter received her B.Sc. in Biological Sciences in 1997 from Purdue University, West Lafayette. During this time, she spent a summer in 1996 as an HHMI Undergraduate Research Fellow in the laboratory of Robert E. Malone at the University of Iowa, working on the control of recombination in yeast. Following her graduation, she spent a summer working on enhancers in Drosophila neural development as a research assistant in the laboratory of Chris Q. Doe, then at the University of Illinois Urbana-Champaign.

=== Graduate training ===
Carpenter carried out research for her Ph.D. in the laboratory of Andrew S. Belmont at the University of Illinois, Urbana-Champaign. There, she developed molecular biology and automated imaging systems to rapidly assess the effects of transcriptional activators on large-scale chromatin structure using fluorescence microscopy. This work laid the foundation for studies of engineered regions of the genome, the movement of genes within the nucleus upon gene activation, and chromatin-related high-throughput screens. She received her PhD in cell biology in May 2003.

=== Post-doctoral training and creation of CellProfiler software ===
Carpenter trained in the laboratory of David M. Sabatini at the Whitehead Institute for Biomedical Research, Cambridge MA, during her postdoctoral work (July 2003 to December 2006). Through co-mentoring by Polina Golland, professor at MIT Computer Science and Artificial Intelligence Laboratory, Carpenter transitioned into a computational researcher during this time. Her research focused on high-throughput microscopy and living cell microarrays to reveal gene function. This required new image analysis methods, so Carpenter and collaborator Thouis Jones designed and in 2005 released the first open-source high-throughput cell image analysis software, CellProfiler, which was first published in 2006. Using this new tool, she led a team of 5 researchers to develop advanced data mining methods to systematically examine the necessity of proteins for a variety of biological processes.

== Research and impact ==
In January 2007, Carpenter founded her laboratory at the Broad Institute of Harvard and MIT, as the Director of the Imaging Platform. Her first NIH R01 grant was awarded in 2010, at the age of 33. In 2017, she became a Broad Institute Scientist.

The Carpenter group develops novel strategies and tools to analyse biological images, particularly microscopy images from high-throughput experiments. Her computer scientists and biologists develop free open-source image analysis and data exploration methods such as CellProfiler and CellProfiler Analyst. Their software work has contributed to open source applications and libraries, including ImageJ, TensorFlow, scikit-image, and scikit-learn. The lab collaborates with biologists, generating discoveries across fields of study and disease areas. Their software enables high-throughput screening in challenging model systems such as C. elegans, 3D cell cultures, and time-lapse video of growing cells.

The focus of the Carpenter lab turned towards machine learning by 2009, and later deep learning, to identify biological structures of interest and to identify patterns resulting from chemical or genetic perturbations to identify cures for diseases. She was an early pioneer of the new field of image-based profiling, which is related to gene expression profiling but uses microscopy images as the data source. Together with Stuart Schreiber, the Carpenter laboratory invented the Cell Painting assay, which is the most widely used for this purpose. Carpenter's CellProfiler software and Cell Painting assay formed the initial scientific platform for Recursion Pharmaceuticals. Dr. Carpenter is a member of the Scientific and Technical Advisory Board for Recursion Pharmaceuticals, in addition to that of Bio-Rad Laboratories.

Carpenter has given more than 200 invited lectures and has chaired several conferences and workshops. She has authored over 200 scientific publications as of 2022. She is known for efforts that organize the scientific community: she was an early Board member for the Society for Biomolecular Imaging and Informatics (SBI2), she founded the CytoData Society, and she led the 2018 Data Science Bowl via Kaggle. Since 2007, Carpenter has supervised over 70 researchers and students, from postdoctoral to high-school level and is known for her informal mentoring as well.

In 2021, Dr. Shantanu Singh became co-leader of Carpenter's laboratory, now called the Carpenter–Singh lab. In 2026, Carpenter has returned to Purdue as a professor.

== Awards and honors ==
- 2021 Honorary Fellow of the Royal Microscopical Society
- 2019 Named in Top 100 AI Leaders in Drug Discovery and Advanced Healthcare
- 2019 Merkin Institute Fellow
- 2018 Outstanding Young Alumni Award from University of Illinois Urbana-Champaign
- 2017 Maximizing Investigators' Research Award (MIRA), NIH NIGMS
- 2017 Elected Fellow, SLAS (Society for Laboratory Automation and Screening)
- 2014 Broad Institute Next Generation Award
- 2012 Awarded NSF CAREER grant
- 2011 Named Young Leader of the French-American Foundation
- 2008 Elected fellow of the Massachusetts Academy of Sciences
- 2008 Featured in PBS special, "Bold Visions: Women in Science & Technology"
- 2007 Named a "Rising Young Investigator" by Genome Technology magazine
