= Ilastik =

ilastik
- Developers: Christoph Sommer, Christoph Straehle, Thorben Kröger, Bernhard X. Kausler, Ullrich Koethe, Fred A. Hamprecht, Anna Kreshuk, Dominik Kutra, Stuart Berg, Benedikt Best, Maksim Novikov, Emil Melnikov, Tomaz Vieira and others
- Release: 2011; 15 years ago
- Stable release: 1.4.2 / May 28, 2026; 5 months ago
- Operating system: Any (Python based)
- Type: Image processing & Computer vision & Machine Learning
- License: GPL2
- Website: www.ilastik.org
- Repository: github.com/ilastik/ilastik

ilastik is free open source software for image classification and segmentation. No previous experience in image processing is required to run the software. Since 2018 ilastik is further developed and maintained by Anna Kreshuk's group at European Molecular Biology Laboratory.

== Features ==
ilastik allows user to annotate an arbitrary number of classes in images with a mouse interface. Using these user annotations and the generic (nonlinear) image features, the user can train a random forest classifier. Trained ilastik classifiers can be applied new data not included in the training set in ilastik via its batch processing functionality, or without using the graphical user interface, in headless mode. ilastik can be integrated into various related tools:

- Pre-trained workflows can be executed directly from ImageJ/Fiji using the ilastik-ImageJ plugin.
- Pre-trained ilastik Pixel Classification workflows can be run directly in Python with the ilastik Python package, which is available via conda.
- ilastik has a CellProfiler module to use ilastik classifiers to process images within a CellProfiler framework.

== History ==
ilastik was first released in 2011 by scientists at the Heidelberg Collaboratory for Image Processing (HCI), University of Heidelberg.

== Application ==
- The Interactive Learning and Segmentation Toolkit
- Carving
- Cell classification and neuron classification
- Synapse detection
- Cell tracking
- Neural Network Classification

== Resources ==
ilastik project is hosted on GitHub. It is a collaborative project, any contributions such as comments, bug reports, bug fixes or code contributions are welcome. The ilastik team can be contacted for user support on the image.sc forum.
