= Nicking enzyme =

Endonuclease that cuts a single DNA strand

A nicking enzyme (or nicking endonuclease) is an enzyme that cuts only one strand of a double-stranded DNA or RNA molecule at a specific recognition nucleotide sequence known as the restriction site. Such enzymes hydrolyze (cut) only one strand of the DNA duplex, to produce DNA molecules that are “nicked”, rather than cleaved.

They can be used for strand-displacement amplification, Nicking Enzyme Amplification Reaction, exonucleolytic degradation, the creation of small gaps, or nick translation. The latter process has been successfully used to incorporate both radioactively labelled nucleotides and fluorescent nucleotides allowing specific regions on a double stranded DNA to be studied. Over 200 nicking enzymes have been studied, and 15 of these are available commercially and are routinely used for research and in commercial products.

The nicking enzyme Nb.BbvCI has been successfully used to incorporate fluorochrome-labeled nucleotides into specific spots of a DNA sequence via nick translation.
