= Nb.BbvCI =

Nb.BbvCI is a nicking endonuclease used to cut one strand of double-stranded DNA. It has been successfully used to incorporate fluorochrome-labeled nucleotides into specific spots of a DNA sequence via nick translation.
