= Nasba =

NASBA may refer to:

== Organizations ==
- National Association of State Boards of Accountancy, a U.S.-based professional association
- National Alliance of State Broadcasters Associations, a U.S.-based trade association

== Science ==
- Nucleic acid sequence-based amplification, an isothermal amplification method for DNA
