= CellProfiler =

Image processing software

- Developers: Anne E. Carpenter, Thouis Jones, Lee Kamentsky, Beth Cimini, Allen Goodman, Claire McQuin, Madison Swain-Bowden, David Stirling, Nodar Gogoberidze, and others (Broad Institute)
- Stable release: 4.2.1 / July 22, 2021; 5 years ago
- Operating system: Any (Python-based)
- Type: Image processing & Image analysis
- License: BSD 3-clause
- Website: www.cellprofiler.org
- Repository: github.com/CellProfiler/CellProfiler

CellProfiler is free, open-source software designed to enable biologists without training in computer vision or programming to quantitatively measure phenotypes from thousands of images automatically. Advanced algorithms for image analysis are available as individual modules that can be placed in sequential order together to form a pipeline; the pipeline is then used to identify and measure biological objects and features in images, particularly those obtained through fluorescence microscopy.

Distributions are available for Microsoft Windows, macOS, and Linux. The source code for CellProfiler is freely available. CellProfiler is developed by the Broad Institute's Imaging Platform.

== Features ==
CellProfiler can read and analyze most common microscopy image formats. Biologists typically use CellProfiler to identify objects of interest (e.g. cells, colonies, C. elegans worms) and then measure their properties of interest. Specialized modules for illumination correction may be applied as pre-processing step to remove distortions due to uneven lighting. Object identification (segmentation) is performed through machine learning or image thresholding, recognition and division of clumped objects, and removal or merging of objects on the basis of size or shape. Each of these steps are customizable by the user for their unique image assay.

A wide variety of measurements can be generated for each identified cell or subcellular compartment, including morphology, intensity, and texture among others. These measurements are accessible by using built-in viewing and plotting data tools, exporting in a comma-delimited spreadsheet format, or importing into a MySQL or SQLite database.

CellProfiler interfaces with the high-performance scientific libraries NumPy and SciPy for many mathematical operations, the Open Microscopy Environment Consortium’s Bio-Formats library for reading more than 100 image file formats, ImageJ for use of plugins and macros, and ilastik for pixel-based classification. While designed and optimized for large numbers of two-dimensional images (the most common high-content screening image format), CellProfiler supports analysis of small-scale experiments and time-lapse movies.

== History ==
CellProfiler was released in December 2005 by scientists from the Whitehead Institute for Biomedical Research and Massachusetts Institute of Technology. It is currently developed and maintained by the Cimini Lab at the Imaging Platform of the Broad Institute.

Originally developed in MATLAB, it was re-written in Python and released as CellProfiler 2.0 in 2010. Version 3.0, supporting volumetric analysis of 3D image stacks and optional deep learning modules, was released in October 2017. CellProfiler 4.0 was released in September 2020 and focused on speed, usability, and utility improvements with most notable example of migration to Python 3.

== Community ==
Because CellProfiler is a free, open-source project, anyone can develop their own image processing algorithms as a new module for CellProfiler and contribute it to the project. The CellProfiler website contains a forum for discussion where new users can have their questions answered, usually by the creators of the project.
