= Silverquant =

Labeling and detection method for DNA microarrays or protein microarrays

Silverquant is a labeling and detection method for DNA microarrays or protein microarrays. A synonym is colorimetric detection. In contrast to the classical signal detection on microarrays by using fluorescence, the colorimetric detection is more sensitive and ozone-stable.

== Chemical reaction ==
The probe to be detected is labeled with some biotin-molecules. After incubation with a gold-coupled anti-biotin conjugate, silver nitrate and a reducing agent are added. The reaction starts whereas the gold particle serves as a starting point for the silver precipitation. The reaction needs to be stopped after a specific time. The constant reaction time is essential to obtain comparable results.

== Detection ==
The silver-stained spots on the microarray are clearly visible. By using a transmission microarray scanner, the signals are transformed into digital values which are finally available as an image file.
