= Anna Kreshuk =

Molecular biologist

- Education: Lomonosov Moscow State University (Diploma); Heidelberg University (Ph.D.)
- Known for: Ilastik
- Scientific career
- Fields: Machine Learning; Computer Vision; Biomedical Image Analysis
- Workplaces: European Molecular Biology Laboratory; Heidelberg University (postdoc); Janelia Research Campus (visiting scientist); CERN; GSI Helmholtz Centre for Heavy Ion Research
- Thesis: Automated Analysis of Biomedical Data from Low to High Resolution (2012)
- Doctoral advisor: Fred Hamprecht
- Website: Kreshuk Lab

Anna Kreshuk is a group leader at the European Molecular Biology Laboratory in Heidelberg, Germany. She joined the Cell Biology and Biophysics Unit in July 2018, where her group employs machine learning to develop automated methods to help biologists speed up image analysis.

== Education ==
Kreshuk studied mathematics at the Lomonosov Moscow State University, finishing with a diploma in 2003. Before starting her Ph.D. studies, Kreshuk worked at CERN (2004–2007) and the GSI Helmholtz Centre for Heavy Ion Research (2007–2008) as a scientific programmer. From 2008 to 2011, she earned her Ph.D. in computer science, working at the Heidelberg Collaboratory for Image Processing (HCI) at the Heidelberg University, supervised by Prof Dr Fred Hamprecht.

== Career and research ==
From 2012 to 2018, Kreshuk was employed at the Heidelberg Collaboratory for Image Processing (HCI) at the Heidelberg University, while pursuing her postgraduate studies.

Since 2018, Kreshuk has been a group leader at the European Molecular Biology Laboratory in Heidelberg, Germany.

Her research group has developed a toolkit for interactive learning and segmentation (Ilastik) to bring machine learning-based methods to members of the life science community without computer vision expertise.

Ilastik's algorithms are versatile and user-friendly, capable of addressing a broad range of image analysis issues. However, complex bioimage datasets often necessitate a more customized approach. Therefore, Kreshuk's team is especially focused on resolving intricate segmentation problems for 3D and large-scale light microscopy or electron microscopy (LM or EM). Recently, they've crafted techniques and tools for segmenting all cells and nuclei in a juvenile worm of the species Platynereis dumerilii (EM), as well as in various plant organs and tissues (LM).

== Awards and honours ==
- 2021 Chan Zuckerberg Initiative Visual Proteomics Imaging Grant
