= Cell painting =

Cell imaging

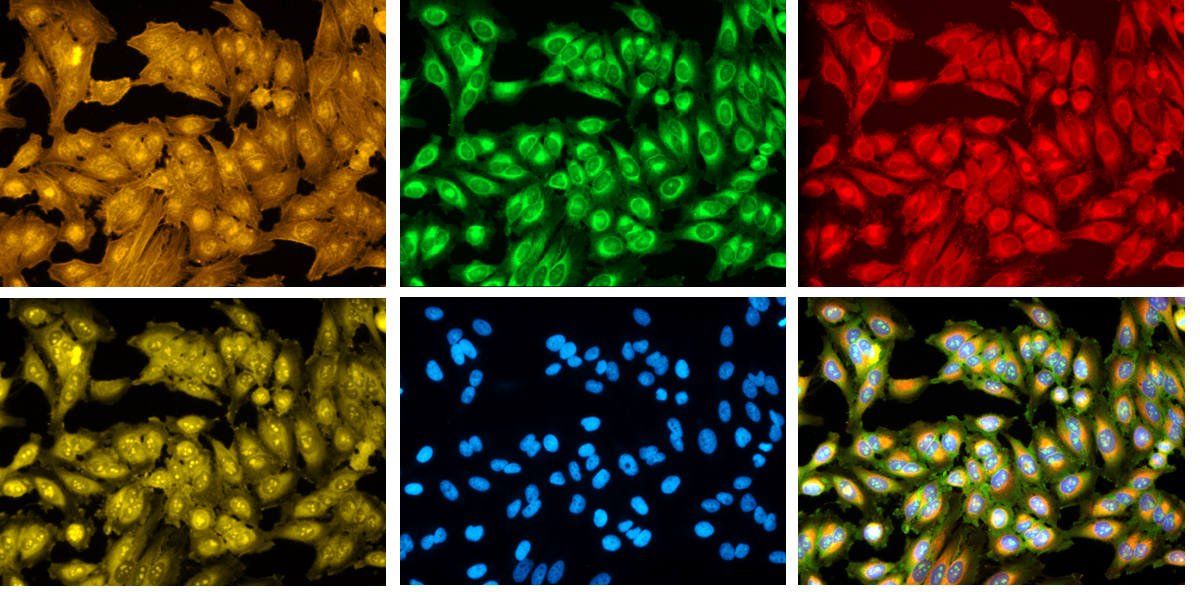
Cell painting, a high-content image-based assay for morphological profiling using multiplexed fluorescent dyes

The cell painting assay is a high-content, high-throughput imaging technique used to capture a wide array of cellular phenotypes in response to diverse perturbations. These phenotypes, often termed "morphological profiles", can be used to understand various biological phenomena, including cellular responses to genetic changes, drug treatments, and other environmental changes. This has been adopted by many pharmaceutical companies in profiling compounds, including Recursion Pharmaceuticals, Bayer, and AstraZeneca

== Methodology ==
In the cell painting assay, cells are stained with six fluorescent dyes imaged in five channels to reveal eight different cellular compartments: nuclei, cytoplasm, endoplasmic reticulum, Golgi apparatus, mitochondria, actin filaments, nucleoli and plasma membrane. Because only five channels can be imaged without significant spectral overlap, two of the dyes share a channel: phalloidin, which stains actin, and wheat germ agglutinin, which stains the Golgi apparatus and plasma membrane, are imaged together. High-resolution images are then captured using automated fluorescence microscopy, and automated image analysis software (typically CellProfiler) identifies individual cells and extracts approximately 1,500 morphological features, including measures of size, shape, texture, intensity, and spatial relationships between structures. These features form the basis of the morphological profile for each perturbation.

=== Variants and Extensions ===
Cell Painting PLUS (CPP) extends the assay using iterative staining and elution cycles, in which fluorescent dyes are removed after imaging so that the same cells can be stained and imaged again. The method allows at least seven dyes labelling nine cellular compartments, including lysosomes, to be imaged in separate channels. This can improve the specificity of morphological measurements for individual organelles and allows the choice of dyes to be adapted to particular experimental applications.

Virtual cell painting uses deep learning models to predict Cell Painting fluorescence images from unlabelled brightfield images of the same cells, potentially avoiding fluorescent staining. Although the predicted images can visually resemble experimentally stained images, morphological features derived from synthetic images may correlate less strongly with those obtained from fluorescence microscopy. Performance can also decrease when models are applied to cell lines not represented during training.

== Applications ==
Given its ability to capture a wide array of cellular responses, the cell painting assay has become a powerful tool in the field of drug discovery. By comparing the morphological profiles of cells treated with different compounds, researchers can identify potential drug candidates, toxicity or understand the mechanism of action of existing drugs. In combination with genetic perturbations, the assay can be used to determine the function of genes or to understand the underlying mechanisms of genetic diseases. By observing how cells from disease models differ in their morphological profiles from healthy cells, researchers can gain insights into disease mechanisms and potential therapeutic interventions.

== Limitations and challenges ==
While the cell painting assay offers a wealth of information, it is not without its challenges. The high dimensionality of the data requires sophisticated computational tools for analysis. Additionally, the interpretation of morphological profiles in terms of underlying biology can sometimes be non-trivial. With advancements in imaging technology and machine learning, the resolution and depth of morphological profiles are expected to increase, allowing for even more detailed insights into cellular biology. As the scientific community continues to generate data using the cell painting assay, there's a push towards creating shared repositories to facilitate collaborative research and data-driven discoveries.

== Notable scientists and contributions ==
- Anne E. Carpenter
- Thouis (Ray) Jones
- Shantanu Singh
- Beth A Cimini
- Sigrun M Gustafsdottir

== See also ==
- High-content screening
- High-throughput screening
- Functional genomics
- Phenotype microarray

== Notable works ==
1. Bray, Mark-Anthony; Singh, Shantanu; Han, Han; Davis, Chadwick T; Borgeson, Blake; Hartland, Cathy; Kost-Alimova, Maria; Gustafsdottir, Sigrun M; Gibson, Christopher C; Carpenter, Anne E (2016-08-25). "Cell Painting, a high-content image-based assay for morphological profiling using multiplexed fluorescent dyes". Nature Protocols. 11 (9): 1757–1774. doi:10.1038/nprot.2016.105. ISSN 1754-2189.
2. Seal, Srijit; Trapotsi, Maria-Anna; Spjuth, Ola; Singh, Shantanu; Carreras-Puigvert, Jordi; Greene, Nigel; Bender, Andreas; Carpenter, Anne E. (2024-12-05). "Cell Painting: a decade of discovery and innovation in cellular imaging". Nature Methods: 1–15. doi:10.1038/s41592-024-02528-8. ISSN 1548-7105.
