= ImageJ =

Java-based image processing program

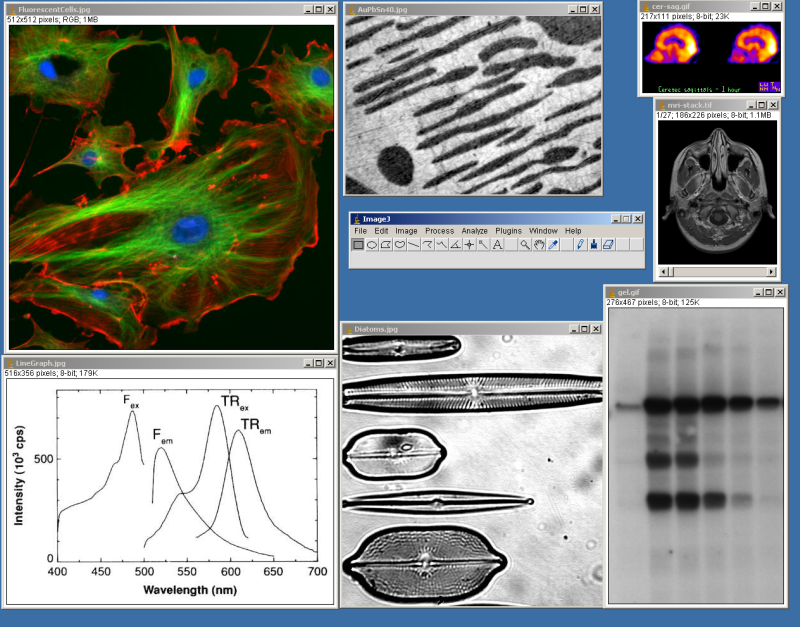
- Screenshot of ImageJ
- Developer: Wayne Rasband (retired from NIH)
- Stable release: 1.54r / 25 September 2025
- Operating system: Any (Java-based)
- Type: Image processing
- License: Public Domain, BSD-2
- Website: imagej.net
- Repository: github.com/imagej/ImageJ

ImageJ is a Java-based image processing program developed at the National Institutes of Health and the Laboratory for Optical and Computational Instrumentation (LOCI, University of Wisconsin). Its first version, ImageJ 1.x, is developed in the public domain, while ImageJ2 and the related projects SciJava, ImgLib2, and SCIFIO are licensed with a permissive BSD-2 license. ImageJ was designed with an open architecture that provides extensibility via Java plugins and recordable macros. Custom acquisition, analysis and processing plugins can be developed using ImageJ's built-in editor and a Java compiler. User-written plugins make it possible to solve many image processing and analysis problems, from three-dimensional live-cell imaging to radiological image processing, multiple imaging system data comparisons to automated hematology systems. ImageJ's plugin architecture and built-in development environment has made it a popular platform for teaching image processing.

ImageJ can be run as an online applet, a downloadable application, or on any computer with a Java 5 or later virtual machine. Downloadable distributions are available for Microsoft Windows, the classic Mac OS, macOS, Linux, and the Sharp Zaurus PDA. The source code for ImageJ is freely available.

The project developer, Wayne Rasband, retired from the Research Services Branch of the NIH's National Institute of Mental Health in 2010, but continues to develop the software.

== Features ==
ImageJ can display, edit, analyze, process, save, and print 8-bit color and grayscale, 16-bit integer, and 32-bit floating point images. It can read many image file formats, including TIFF, PNG, GIF, JPEG, BMP, DICOM, and FITS, as well as raw formats. ImageJ supports image stacks, a series of images that share a single window, and it is multithreaded, so time-consuming operations can be performed in parallel on multi-CPU hardware. ImageJ can calculate area and pixel value statistics of user-defined selections and intensity-thresholded objects. It can measure distances and angles. It can create density histograms and line profile plots. It supports standard image processing functions such as logical and arithmetical operations between images, contrast manipulation, convolution, Fourier analysis, sharpening, smoothing, edge detection, and median filtering. It does geometric transformations such as scaling, rotation, and flips. The program supports any number of images simultaneously, limited only by available memory.

== History ==
Before the release of ImageJ in 1997, a similar freeware image analysis program known as NIH Image had been developed in Object Pascal for Macintosh computers running pre-OS X operating systems. Further development of this code continues in the form of Image SXM, a variant tailored for physical research of scanning microscope images. A Windows version – ported by Scion Corporation (now defunct), so-called Scion Image for Windows – was also developed. Both versions are still available but – in contrast to NIH Image – closed-source.

On January 25, 2017, AstroImageJ (AIJ) was published by Karen Collins, John Kielkopf, Keivan Stassun, and Frederic Hessman. AIJ built upon the ImageJ processing pipeline, streamlining the software to excel at time-series differential photometry, light curve detrending and fitting, and ultra-precise light curve plotting. AIJ reads and write FITS files, generates master frames, and handles dark, bias, and flat-field subtraction all within the software. AIJ is used for multi-aperture differential photometry and exoplanet transit modeling, with built-in support for modifying aperture and annulus radii, choosing target and comparison objects simply by clicking, adjusting transit priors, and exporting data as a FITS and/or XML file.

== See also ==
- Eclipse ImageJ Plugin - An plugin which integrates ImageJ in a flexible tabbed view interface and also offers a powerful macro editor with a debugging interface.
- Bitplane - producers of image processing software with ImageJ compatibility
- CellProfiler, a software package for high-throughput image analysis by interactive construction of workflow. The workflow could include ImageJ macro
- CVIPtools A complete open-source GUI-based Computer Vision and Image Processing software, with C functions libraries COM based dll along with two utilities program for algorithm development and batch processing.
- Fiji (software), an image processing package based on ImageJ
- Gwyddion (software)
- KNIME - an open-source data mining environment supporting image analysis developed in close collaboration with the next generation of ImageJ
- List of free and open-source software packages
- Microscope image processing
