= Microscope image processing =

Use of digital image processing to process images obtained from a microscope

Microscope image processing is a broad term that covers the use of digital image processing techniques to process, analyze and present images obtained from a microscope. Such processing is now commonplace in a number of diverse fields such as medicine, biological research, cancer research, drug testing, metallurgy, etc. A number of manufacturers of microscopes now specifically design in features that allow the microscopes to interface to an image processing system.

== Image acquisition ==
Until the early 1990s, most image acquisition in video microscopy applications was typically done with an analog video camera, often simply closed circuit TV cameras. While this required the use of a frame grabber to digitize the images, video cameras provided images at full video frame rate (25-30 frames per second) allowing live video recording and processing. While the advent of solid state detectors yielded several advantages, the real-time video camera was actually superior in many respects.

Today, acquisition is usually done using a CCD camera mounted in the optical path of the microscope. The camera may be full colour or monochrome. Very often, very high resolution cameras are employed to gain as much direct information as possible. Cryogenic cooling is also common, to minimise noise. Often digital cameras used for this application provide pixel intensity data to a resolution of 12-16 bits, much higher than is used in consumer imaging products.

In recent years, lots of effort has been put into acquiring data at video rates, or higher (25-30 frames per second or higher). What was once easy to do with off-the-shelf video cameras now requires special, high speed electronics to handle the vast digital data bandwidth.

Higher speed acquisition allows dynamic processes to be observed in real time, or stored for later playback and analysis. Combined with the high image resolution, this approach can generate vast quantities of raw data, which can be a challenge to deal with, even with a modern computer system.

While current CCD detectors allow very high image resolution, often this involves a trade-off because, for a given chip size, as the pixel count increases, the pixel size decreases. As the pixels get smaller, their well depth decreases, reducing the number of electrons that can be stored. In turn, this results in a poorer signal-to-noise ratio.

For best results, one must select an appropriate sensor for a given application. Because microscope images have an intrinsic limiting resolution, it often makes little sense to use a noisy, high resolution detector for image acquisition. A more modest detector, with larger pixels, can often produce much higher quality images because of reduced noise. This is especially important in low-light applications such as fluorescence microscopy.

Moreover, one must also consider the temporal resolution requirements of the application. A lower resolution detector will often have a significantly higher acquisition rate, permitting the observation of faster events. Conversely, if the observed object is motionless, one may wish to acquire images at the highest possible spatial resolution without regard to the time required to acquire a single image.

== 2D image techniques ==
Image processing for microscopy application begins with fundamental techniques intended to most accurately reproduce the information contained in the microscopic sample. This might include adjusting the brightness and contrast of the image, averaging images to reduce image noise and correcting for illumination non-uniformities. Such processing involves only basic arithmetic operations between images (i.e. addition, subtraction, multiplication and division). The vast majority of processing done on microscope image is of this nature.

Another class of common 2D operations called image convolution are often used to reduce or enhance image details. Such "blurring" and "sharpening" algorithms in most programs work by altering a pixel's value based on a weighted sum of that and the surrounding pixels (a more detailed description of kernel based convolution deserves an entry for itself) or by altering the frequency domain function of the image using Fourier Transform. Most image processing techniques are performed in the Frequency domain.

Other basic two dimensional techniques include operations such as image rotation, warping, color balancing etc.

At times, advanced techniques are employed with the goal of "undoing" the distortion of the optical path of the microscope, thus eliminating distortions and blurring caused by the instrumentation. This process is called deconvolution, and a variety of algorithms have been developed, some of great mathematical complexity. The result is an image far sharper and clearer than could be obtained in the optical domain alone. This is typically a 3-dimensional operation, that analyzes a volumetric image (i.e. images taken at a variety of focal planes through the sample) and uses this data to reconstruct a more accurate 3-dimensional image.

== 3D image techniques ==
Another common requirement is to take a series of images at a fixed position, but at different focal depths. Since most microscopic samples are essentially transparent, and the depth of field of the focused sample is exceptionally narrow, it is possible to capture images "through" a three-dimensional object using 2D equipment like confocal microscopes. Software is then able to reconstruct a 3D model of the original sample which may be manipulated appropriately. The processing turns a 2D instrument into a 3D instrument, which would not otherwise exist. In recent times this technique has led to a number of scientific discoveries in cell biology.

== Analysis ==
Analysis of images will vary considerably according to application. Typical analysis includes determining where the edges of an object are, counting similar objects, calculating the area, perimeter length and other useful measurements of each object. A common approach is to create an image mask which only includes pixels that match certain criteria, then perform simpler scanning operations on the resulting mask. It is also possible to label objects and track their motion over a series of frames in a video sequence.

== See also ==
- Image processing
