= NASBA (molecular biology) =

Nucleic acid sequence-based amplification, commonly referred to as NASBA, is a method in molecular biology which is used to produce multiple copies of single stranded RNA. NASBA is a two-step process that takes RNA and anneals specially designed primers, then utilizes an enzyme cocktail to amplify it.

== Background ==
Nucleic acid amplification is a technique used to produce several copies of a specific segment of RNA/DNA. Amplified RNA and DNA can be used for a variety of applications, such as genotyping, sequencing, and detection of bacteria or viruses. There are two different types of amplification, non-isothermal and isothermal. Non-isothermal amplification produces multiple copies of RNA/DNA through reiterative cycling between different temperatures. Isothermal amplification produces multiple copies of RNA/DNA at a constant reaction temperature. NASBA takes single stranded RNA, anneals primers to it at 65 °C, and then amplifies it at 41 °C to produce multiple copies of single stranded RNA. In order for successful amplification to occur, an enzyme cocktail containing, Avian Myeloblastosis Reverse Transcriptase (AMV-RT), RNase H, and RNA polymerase is used. AMV-RT synthesizes a complementary DNA strand (cDNA) from the RNA template once the primer is annealed. RNase H then degrades the RNA template and the other primer binds to the cDNA to form double stranded DNA, which RNA polymerase uses to synthesize copies of RNA. One key aspect of NASBA is that the starting material and end product is always single stranded RNA. That being said, it can be used to amplify DNA, but the DNA must be transcribed into RNA in order for successful amplification to occur.

Loop-mediated isothermal amplification (LAMP) is another isothermal amplification technique.

== History ==
NASBA was developed by J Compton in 1991, who defined it as "a primer-dependent technology that can be used for the continuous amplification of nucleic acids in a single mixture at one temperature". Immediately after the invention of NASBA it was used for the rapid diagnosis and quantification of HIV-1 in patient sera. Although RNA can also be amplified by PCR using a reverse transcriptase (in order to synthesize a complementary DNA strand as a template), NASBA's main advantage is that it works under isothermal conditions – usually at a constant temperature of 41 °C or two different temperatures, depending on the primers and enzymes used. Even when two different temperatures are applied, it is still considered isothermal, because it does not cycle back and forth between those temperatures. NASBA can be used in medical diagnostics as an alternative to PCR that is quicker and more sensitive in some circumstances.

== Principle of amplification ==
NASBA functions as follows:

1. RNA template added to the reaction mixture, the first primer with the T7 promoter region on its 5' end attaches to its complementary site at the 3' end of the template.
2. Reverse transcriptase synthesizes the opposite complementary DNA strand extending the 3' end of the primer, moving upstream along the RNA template.
3. RNAse H destroys the RNA template from the DNA-RNA compound (RNAse H only destroys RNA in RNA-DNA hybrids, but not single-stranded RNA).
4. The second primer attaches to the 5' end of the (antisense) DNA strand.
5. Reverse transcriptase again synthesizes another DNA strand from the attached primer resulting in double stranded DNA.
6. T7 RNA polymerase binds to the promoter region on the double strand. Since T7 RNA polymerase can only transcribe in the 3' to 5' direction the sense DNA is transcribed and an anti-sense RNA is produced. This is repeated, and the polymerase continuously produces complementary RNA strands of this template which results in amplification.
7. Now a cyclic phase can begin similar to the previous steps. Here, however, the second primer first binds to the (-)RNA
8. The reverse transcriptase now produces a (+)cDNA/(-)RNA duplex.
9. RNAse H again degrades the RNA and the first primer binds to the now single stranded +(cDNA)
10. The reverse transcriptase now produces the complementary (-)DNA, creating a dsDNA duplex
11. Exactly like step 6, the T7 polymerase binds to the promoter region to produce (-)RNA, and the cycle is complete.

== Clinical applications ==
The NASBA technique has been used to develop rapid diagnostic tests for several pathogenic viruses with single-stranded RNA genomes, e.g. influenza A, zika virus, foot-and-mouth disease virus, severe acute respiratory syndrome (SARS)-associated coronavirus, human bocavirus (HBoV) and also parasites like Trypanosoma brucei.

Recently, NASBA reaction with fluoresce, dipstick and next generation sequencing readout has been developed for COVID-19 diagnosis.

== See also ==
- Real-time polymerase chain reaction
