= Nick translation =

Tagging technique in molecular biology

Nick translation (or head translation), developed in 1977 by Peter Rigby and Paul Berg, is a tagging technique in molecular biology in which DNA polymerase I is used to replace some of the nucleotides of a DNA sequence with their labeled analogues, creating a tagged DNA sequence which can be used as a probe in fluorescent in situ hybridization (FISH) or blotting techniques. It can also be used for radiolabeling.

This process is called "nick translation" because the DNA to be processed is treated with DNAase to produce single-stranded "nicks", where one of the strands is missing nucleotides. This is followed by replacement in nicked sites by DNA polymerase I, which removes nucleotides from the 3' (downstream) end of a nick with its 3'-5' exonuclease activity and adds new, labeled dNTPs from the medium to the 5' end of the nick, moving the nick downstream in the process. To radioactively label a DNA fragment for use as a probe in blotting procedures, one of the incorporated nucleotides provided in the reaction is radiolabeled in the alpha phosphate position, often using phosphorus-32. Similarly, a fluorophore can be attached instead for fluorescent labelling, or an antigen for immunodetection. When DNA polymerase I eventually detaches from the DNA, it leaves another nick in the phosphate backbone. The nick has "translated" some distance depending on the processivity of the polymerase. This nick could be sealed by DNA ligase, or its 3' hydroxyl group could serve as the template for further DNA polymerase I activity. Proprietary enzyme mixes are available commercially to perform all steps in the procedure in a single incubation.

Nick translation could cause double-stranded DNA breaks, if DNA polymerase I encounters another nick on the opposite strand, resulting in two shorter fragments. This does not influence the performance of the labelled probe in in-situ hybridization.
