= Bioconductor =

Software project for the analysis of genomic data

- Stable release: 3.23 / 29 April 2026; 0 days ago
- Operating system: Linux, macOS, Windows
- Platform: R programming language
- Type: Bioinformatics
- License: Artistic License 2.0
- Website: www.bioconductor.org

Bioconductor is a free, open source and open development software project for the analysis and comprehension of genomic data generated by wet lab experiments in molecular biology.

Bioconductor is based primarily on the statistical R programming language, but does contain contributions in other programming languages. It has two releases each year that follow the semiannual releases of R. At any one time there is a release version, which corresponds to the released version of R, and a development version, which corresponds to the development version of R. Most users will find the release version appropriate for their needs. In addition there are many genome annotation packages available that are mainly, but not solely, oriented towards different types of microarrays.

The project was started in the Fall of 2001 and is overseen by the Bioconductor core team, based primarily at the Fred Hutchinson Cancer Research Center, with other members coming from international institutions.

== Packages ==
Most Bioconductor components are distributed as R packages, which are add-on modules for R. Initially most of the Bioconductor software packages focused on the analysis of single channel Affymetrix and two or more channel cDNA/Oligo microarrays. As the project has matured, the functional scope of the software packages broadened to include the analysis of all types of genomic data, such as SAGE, sequence, or SNP data.

== Goals ==
The broad goals of the projects are to:

- Provide widespread access to a broad range of powerful statistical and graphical methods for the analysis of genomic data.
- Facilitate the inclusion of biological metadata in the analysis of genomic data, e.g. literature data from PubMed, annotation data from LocusLink/Entrez.
- Provide a common software platform that enables the rapid development and deployment of plug-able, scalable, and interoperable software.
- Further scientific understanding by producing high-quality documentation and reproducible research.
- Train researchers on computational and statistical methods for the analysis of genomic data.

== Main features ==
- Documentation and reproducible research. Each Bioconductor package contains at least one vignette, which is a document that provides a textual, task-oriented description of the package's functionality. These vignettes come in several forms. Many are simple "How-to"s that are designed to demonstrate how a particular task can be accomplished with that package's software. Others provide a more thorough overview of the package or might even discuss general issues related to the package. In the future, the Bioconductor project is looking towards providing vignettes that are not specifically tied to a package, but rather are demonstrating more complex concepts. As with all aspects of the Bioconductor project, users are encouraged to participate in this effort.
- Statistical and graphical methods. The Bioconductor project aims to provide access to a wide range of powerful statistical and graphical methods for the analysis of genomic data. Analysis packages are available for: pre-processing Affymetrix and Illumina, cDNA array data; identifying differentially expressed genes; graph theoretical analyses; plotting genomic data. In addition, the R package system itself provides implementations for a broad range of state-of-the-art statistical and graphical techniques, including linear and non-linear modeling, cluster analysis, prediction, resampling, survival analysis, and time series analysis.
- Genome annotation. The Bioconductor project provides software for associating microarray and other genomic data in real time to biological metadata from web databases such as GenBank, LocusLink and PubMed (annotate package). Functions are also provided for incorporating the results of statistical analysis in HTML reports with links to annotation WWW resources. Software tools are available for assembling and processing genomic annotation data, from databases such as GenBank, the Gene Ontology Consortium, LocusLink, UniGene, the UCSC Human Genome Project and others with the AnnotationDbi package. Data packages are distributed to provide mappings between different probe identifiers (e.g. Affy IDs, LocusLink, PubMed). Customized annotation libraries can also be assembled.This project also contain several functions for genomic analysis and phylogenetic (e.g. ggtree, phytools packages ..).
- Open source. The Bioconductor project has a commitment to full open source discipline, with distribution via a SourceForge.net-like platform. All contributions are expected to exist under an open source license such as Artistic 2.0, GPL2, or BSD. There are many different reasons why open-source software is beneficial to the analysis of microarray data and to computational biology in general. The reasons include:
  - To provide full access to algorithms and their implementation
  - To facilitate software improvements through bug fixing and plug-ins
  - To encourage good scientific computing and statistical practice by providing appropriate tools and instruction
  - To provide a workbench of tools that allow researchers to explore and expand the methods used to analyze biological data
  - To ensure that the international scientific community is the owner of the software tools needed to carry out research
  - To lead and encourage commercial support and development of those tools that are successful
  - To promote reproducible research by providing open and accessible tools with which to carry out that research (reproducible research is distinct from independent verification)
- Open development. Users are encouraged to become developers, either by contributing Bioconductor compliant packages or documentation. Additionally Bioconductor provides a mechanism for linking together different groups with common goals to foster collaboration on software, possibly at the level of shared development.

== Milestones ==
Each release of Bioconductor is developed to work best with a chosen version of R. In addition to bugfixes and updates, a new release typically adds packages. The table below maps a Bioconductor release to a R version and shows the number of available Bioconductor software packages for that release.

Version	Release date	Package count	R dependency
3.23	29 Apr 2026	2418	R 4.6
3.22	30 Oct 2025	2361	R 4.5
3.20	30 Oct 2024	2289	R 4.4
3.18	25 Oct 2023	2266	R 4.3
3.16	2 Nov 2022	2183	R 4.2
3.14	27 Oct 2021	2083	R 4.1
3.11	28 Apr 2020	1903	R 4.0
3.10	30 Oct 2019	1823	R 3.6
3.8	31 Oct 2018	1649	R 3.5
3.6	31 Oct 2017	1473	R 3.4
3.4	18 Oct 2016	1296	R 3.3
3.2	14 Oct 2015	1104	R 3.2
3.0	14 Oct 2014	934	R 3.1
2.13	15 Oct 2013	749	R 3.0
2.11	3 Oct 2012	610	R 2.15
2.9	1 Nov 2011	517	R 2.14
2.8	14 Apr 2011	466	R 2.13
2.7	18 Nov 2010	418	R 2.12
2.6	23 Apr 2010	389	R 2.11
2.5	28 Oct 2009	352	R 2.10
2.4	21 Apr 2009	320	R 2.9
2.3	22 Oct 2008	294	R 2.8
2.2	1 May 2008	260	R 2.7
2.1	8 Oct 2007	233	R 2.6
2.0	26 Apr 2007	214	R 2.5
1.9	4 Oct 2006	188	R 2.4
1.8	27 Apr 2006	172	R 2.3
1.7	14 Oct 2005	141	R 2.2
1.6	18 May 2005	123	R 2.1
1.5	25 Oct 2004	100	R 2.0
1.4	17 May 2004	81	R 1.9
1.3	30 Oct 2003	49	R 1.8
1.2	29 May 2003	30	R 1.7
1.1	19 Oct 2002	20	R 1.6
1.0	1 May 2002	15	R 1.5

== Application of Bioconductor in small-RNA seq and microRNA data analysis ==
=== Introduction ===
Small RNA sequencing is a widely used technique to study microRNA(miRNAs), small interfering RNAs (siRNAs), piwi-interacting RNA (piRNAs) that play a crucial role in RNA-mediated gene silencing process or known as RNA silencing /Gene silencing process. RNA silencing process employs different types of substrates which give rise to different types of RNA population, namely microRNAs, siRNAs, etc. In the laboratory, small RNA sequencing typically start by extraction of RNA from cells or tissues, followed by Adapter ligation to the 5' and 3' ends of small RNAs, followed by Reverse transcription and PCR amplification to generate cDNA libraries. Finally, High-throughput sequencing ( most commonly Illumina platforms) is used to produce millions of short reads. These resulting data then undergo computational processing to align reads to reference genomes of particular species or miRNA databases.

=== Bioconductor in RNA Biology ===
Bioconductor(BioC) is a widely used open-source platform for analysing different types of small-RNA sequencing and genomic data. It primarily utilizes the R programming language and offers a wide range of packages for bioinformatics and computational biology. Bioconductor provides a wide range of packages for handling small-RNA seq data among them few are widely used by researchers. Popular Bioconductor packages like DESeq2, edgeR, limma + voom, GenomicAlignment, GenomicFeatures, Rsubread, ShortRead, featureCounts provide robust analysis of RNA-seq data.

==== DESeq2 ====
It uses a negative binomial distribution modeling for differential expression analysis of read count from RNA-seq data. It is popular for dispersion estimation, normalization, and visualization by PCA plots or MA plots.

==== edgeR ====
It also uses a negative binomial distribution modeling for differential expression analysis of read count from RNA seq data. In contrast with DESeq2, it is used when sample number is relatively small.

==== limma + voom ====
It is used to estimate the mean-variance relationship of count data and transforms it to log2-counts per million (CPM). It is used for analysing microarray data and also to calculate CPM value from RNA-seq data.

==== GenomicAlignment ====
It is widely popular for reads like BAM and SAM file alignment to assign aligned reads to genes or miRNAs for downstream analysis.

==== GenomicFeatures ====
It is used to build transcript-centric annotation databases like TxDb objects which store information about genes, exons, transcripts from GTF/GFF files.

==== Rsubread ====
It is used mostly for summarizing the reads and mapping, where functions like align(), featureCounts() are used to provide an efficient alternative to external aligners like STAR or HISAT2.

=== ShortRead ===
It is often used to pre-process the raw FASTQ files to check the quality of raw FASTQ data, which comes from a sequencing platform like Illumina sequencing etc.

=== Computational Workflow ===
==== Data Import and Quality Control ====
FASTQ files are typically imported by using different Bioconductor packages like ShortRead which provides quality assessment reports.

==== Adapter Trimming and Filtering ====
Different external tools like Cutadapt, trimmomatic is used to remove the adapter sequence from the raw FASTQ files. This helps to improve the Reads quality.

==== Read Alignment ====
The processed Reads are aligned to the reference genome. This alignment can be done by different aligners like Rsubread, or external tools such as STAR, with results stored in standard formats like SAM (Sequence Alignment Map) or BAM (Binary Alignment Map) files .

==== Annotation of microRNAs ====
Bioconductor supports to integrate miRBase data where different packages like miRBaseConverter, AnnotationHub, org.Mm.eg.db are used for annotate reads to known miRNAs.

==== Quantification ====
Count reads are mapped to known genes or microRNAs, and summarize counts across samples.

==== Differential Expression Analysis ====
After mapping and quantifying microRNA expression, different well-established packages like DESeq2, edgeR are used for differential expression analysis.

==== Visualization ====
To interpret and present miRNA expression results, different visualization packages are used like ggplot2, pheatmap, ComplexHeatmap which generates Volcano plot (statistics), PCA plot (Principal component analysis), MA plot, pheatmap are used to visualize the differential expression data.

== Resources ==
- Gentleman, R.; Carey, V.; Huber, W.; Irizarry, R.; Dudoit, S. (2005). Bioinformatics and Computational Biology Solutions Using R and Bioconductor. Springer. ISBN 978-0-387-25146-2.
- Gentleman, R. (2008). R Programming for Bioinformatics. Chapman & Hall/CRC. ISBN 978-1-4200-6367-7.
- Hahne, F.; Huber, W.; Gentleman, R.; Falcon, S. (2008). Bioconductor Case Studies. Springer. ISBN 978-0-387-77239-4.
- Gentleman, Robert C.; Carey, Vincent J.; Bates, Douglas M.; Bolstad, Ben; Dettling, Marcel; Dudoit, Sandrine; Ellis, Byron; Gautier, Laurent; Ge, Yongchao; Gentry, Jeff; Hornik, Kurt; Hothorn, Torsten; Huber, Wolfgang; Iacus, Stefano; Irizarry, Rafael; Leisch, Friedrich; Li, Cheng; Maechler, Martin; Rossini, Anthony J.; Sawitzki, Gunther; Smith, Colin; Smyth, Gordon; Tierney, Luke; Yang, Jean Y. H.; Zhang, Jianhua (2004). "Bioconductor: open software development for computational biology and bioinformatics". Genome Biology. 5 (10): R80. doi:10.1186/gb-2004-5-10-r80. PMC 545600. PMID 15461798.

== See also ==
- Computational biology
- Bioinformatics
- List of open source bioinformatics software
- List of sequence alignment software
- R (programming language)
- DNA microarray
- Affymetrix, a microarray technology platform
