= RTCB =

Protein-coding gene in the species Homo sapiens

Identifiers
- Aliases: RTCB, C22orf28, DJ149A16.6, FAAP, HSPC117, RNA 2',3'-cyclic phosphate and 5'-OH ligase
- External IDs: OMIM: 613901; MGI: 106379; GeneCards: RTCB
Enzyme activity
EC #	BRENDA	ExPASy	KEGG	MetaCyc
6.5.1.8	↗	↗	↗	↗

Gene location (Human)
Chr.	Chromosome 22 (human)
Band	22q12.3	Start	32,387,582 bp
Band	22q12.3	End	32,412,248 bp

Gene location (Mouse)
Chr.	Chromosome 10 (mouse)
Band	10 C1|10 41.81 cM	Start	85,774,501 bp
Band	10 C1|10 41.81 cM	End	85,793,687 bp
RNA expression pattern
Bgee	Human / Mouse (ortholog); Top expressed in: jejunal mucosa; islet of Langerhans; mucosa of ileum; duodenum; rectum; skin of leg; skin of abdomen; beta cell; skin of arm; smooth muscle tissue / Top expressed in: primitive streak; mandibular prominence; maxillary prominence; endocardial cushion; facial motor nucleus; vestibular sensory epithelium; efferent ductule; lobe of prostate; Rostral migratory stream; vas deferens; More reference expression data
BioGPS	n/a
Gene ontology
Molecular function	vinculin binding; nucleotide binding; RNA ligase (ATP) activity; ligase activity; protein binding; ATP binding; RNA ligase activity; metal ion binding; RNA binding
Cellular component	cytoplasm; tRNA-splicing ligase complex; nuclear envelope; endoplasmic reticulum membrane; nucleus; nucleoplasm; cytosol; intracellular membrane-bounded organelle
Biological process	RNA processing; tRNA splicing, via endonucleolytic cleavage and ligation; tRNA processing; tRNA exon ligation utilizing 2',3' cyclic phosphate of 5'-exon as source of linkage phosphate; in utero embryonic development; placenta development
Sources:Amigo / QuickGO
Orthologs
Databases	NCBI: entry; OMA: entry
Species	Human	Mouse
Entrez	51493	28088
Ensembl	ENSG00000100220	ENSMUSG00000001783
UniProt	Q9Y3I0	Q99LF4
RefSeq (mRNA)	NM_014306	NM_145422
RefSeq (protein)	NP_055121	NP_663397
Location (UCSC)	Chr 22: 32.39 – 32.41 Mb	Chr 10: 85.77 – 85.79 Mb
PubMed search
- Wikidata
View/Edit Human	View/Edit Mouse

RNA 2',3'-cyclic phosphate and 5'-OH ligase is a protein that in humans is encoded by the RTCB gene. It is found in the stress granule of cells.

== Structure ==
As of June 2019, no crystal structure of the human RTCB is known, but homology models built from other RtcB-family ligases are available (Swiss-model: Q9Y3I0). The structure of Pyrococcus horikoshii RtcB, which uses GTP instead of ATP, shows two manganese (Mn^{2+}) cofactors, and a mechanism involving a covalently linked GTP-histidine-RtcB intermediate. The residue involved, H404, is conserved in human RTCB as H428.

Crystal structures of human RTCB in complex with human archease demonstrates that archease is essential for the activation of RTCB.

== Function ==
RTCB is an RNA ligase that catalyzes the joining of 2′,3′-cyclic phosphate and 5′-OH ends of RNA. In both humans and Escherichia coli it is involved in tRNA and mRNA splicing, specifically in excising transposable elements in animals.

== Protein family ==
tRNA splicing ligase RtcB

Identifiers
- Symbol: RtcB
- Pfam: PF01139
- InterPro: IPR001233
- PROSITE: PS01288
- CATH: 1uc2
- SCOP2: 1uc2 / SCOPe / SUPFAM
Available protein structures:
- PDB: IPR001233 PF01139 (ECOD; PDBsum)
- AlphaFold: IPR001233; PF01139

RTCB belongs to the RtcB family of ATP-dependent RNA ligases, named after the eponymous protein in E. coli.
