= MMPU =

MMPU may refer to:

- Molecular Medicine Partnership Unit, an alliance between the European Molecular Biology Laboratory (EMBL) and the Medical Faculty of the University of Heidelberg.
- Musical Mutual Protective Union, a New York union of musicians
