= Hentze =

Hentze is a surname. Notable people with the surname include:

- Ebba Hentze (1930–2015), Faroese writer
- Matthias Hentze (born 1960), German scientist
