= Binary logarithm =

Exponent of a power of two

Graph of log_{2} x as a function of a positive real number x

In mathematics, the binary logarithm (log_{2} n) is the power to which the number 2 must be raised to obtain the value n. That is, for any real number x,
$$x=\log_2 n \quad\Longleftrightarrow\quad 2^x=n.$$
For example, the binary logarithm of 1 is 0, the binary logarithm of 2 is 1, the binary logarithm of 4 is 2, and the binary logarithm of 32 is 5.

The binary logarithm is the logarithm to the base 2 and is the inverse function of the power of two function. There are several alternatives to the log_{2} notation for the binary logarithm; see the Notation section below.

Historically, the first application of binary logarithms was in music theory, by Leonhard Euler: the binary logarithm of a frequency ratio of two musical tones gives the number of octaves by which the tones differ. Binary logarithms can be used to calculate the length of the representation of a number in the binary numeral system, or the number of bits needed to encode a message in information theory. In computer science, they count the number of steps needed for binary search and related algorithms. Other areas in which the binary logarithm is frequently used include combinatorics, bioinformatics, the design of sports tournaments, and photography.

Binary logarithms are included in the standard C mathematical functions and other mathematical software packages.

== History ==
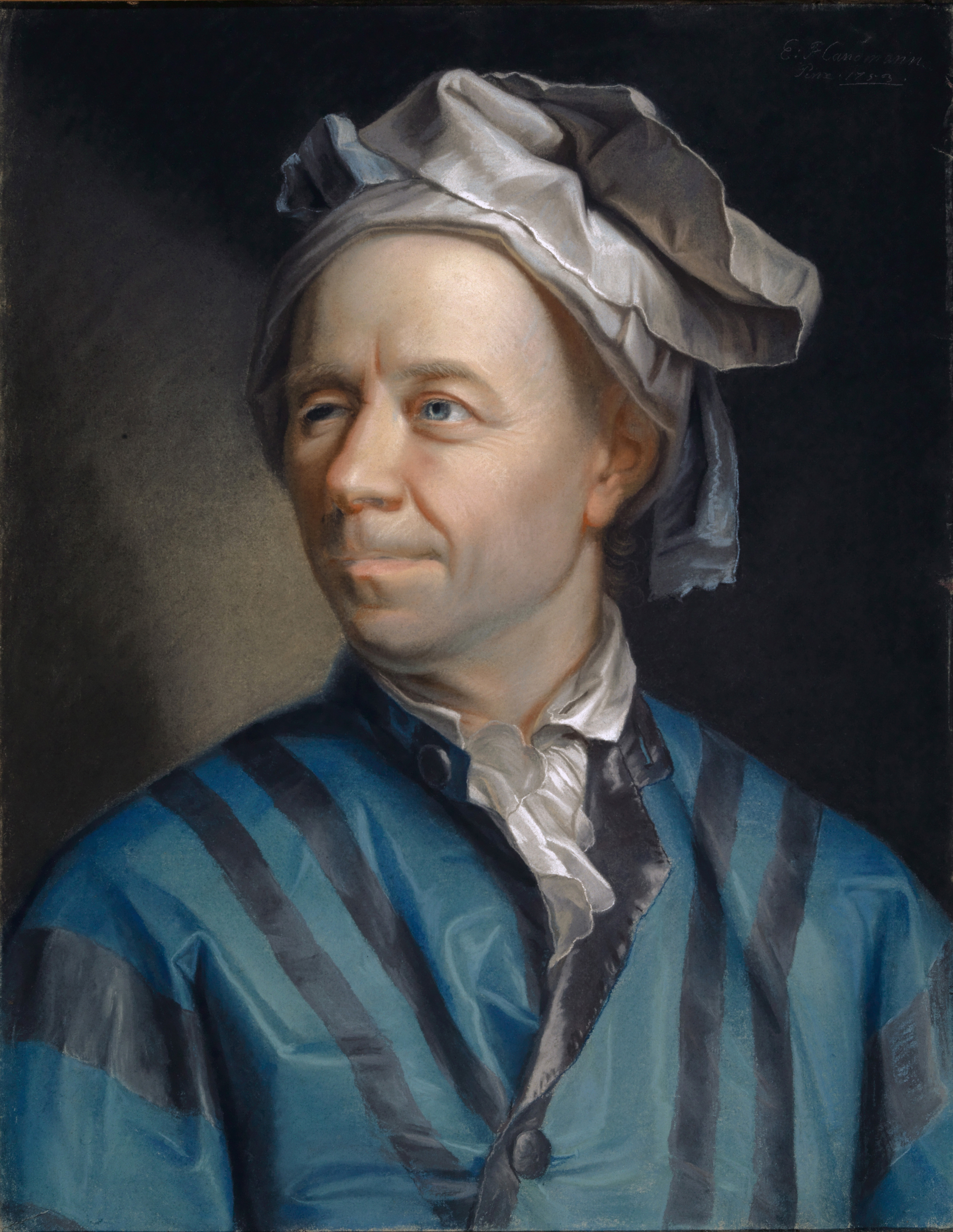
Leonhard Euler was the first to apply binary logarithms to music theory, in 1739.

The powers of two have been known since antiquity; for instance, they appear in Euclid's Elements, Props. IX.32 (on the factorization of powers of two) and IX.36 (half of the Euclid–Euler theorem, on the structure of even perfect numbers). And the binary logarithm of a power of two is just its position in the ordered sequence of powers of two. On this basis, Michael Stifel has been credited with publishing the first known table of binary logarithms in 1544. His book Arithmetica Integra contains several tables that show the integers with their corresponding powers of two. Reversing the rows of these tables allow them to be interpreted as tables of binary logarithms.

Earlier than Stifel, the 8th century Jain mathematician Virasena is credited with a precursor to the binary logarithm. Virasena's concept of ardhacheda has been defined as the number of times a given number can be divided evenly by two. This definition gives rise to a function that coincides with the binary logarithm on the powers of two, but it is different for other integers, giving the 2-adic order rather than the logarithm.

The modern form of a binary logarithm, applying to any number (not just powers of two) was considered explicitly by Leonhard Euler in 1739. Euler established the application of binary logarithms to music theory, long before their applications in information theory and computer science became known. As part of his work in this area, Euler published a table of binary logarithms of the integers from 1 to 8, to seven decimal digits of accuracy.

== Definition and properties ==
The binary logarithm function may be defined as the inverse function to the power of two function, which is a strictly increasing function over the positive real numbers and therefore has a unique inverse. Alternatively, it may be defined as ln n / ln 2, where ln is the natural logarithm, defined in any of its standard ways. Using the complex logarithm in this definition allows the binary logarithm to be extended to the complex numbers.

As with other logarithms, the binary logarithm obeys the following equations, which can be used to simplify formulas that combine binary logarithms with multiplication or exponentiation:
$$\log_2 xy=\log_2 x + \log_2 y$$
$$\log_2\frac{x}{y}=\log_2 x - \log_2 y$$
$$\log_2 x^y = y\log_2 x.$$
For more, see list of logarithmic identities.

== Notation ==
In mathematics, the binary logarithm of a number n is often written as log_{2} n. However, several other notations for this function have been used or proposed, especially in application areas.

Some authors write the binary logarithm as lg n, the notation listed in The Chicago Manual of Style. Donald Knuth credits this notation to a suggestion of Edward Reingold, but its use in both information theory and computer science dates to before Reingold was active. The binary logarithm has also been written as log n with a prior statement that the default base for the logarithm is 2. Another notation that is often used for the same function (especially in the German scientific literature) is ld n, from Latin logarithmus dualis or logarithmus dyadis. The DIN 1302, ISO 31-11 and ISO 80000-2 standards recommend yet another notation, lb n. According to these standards, lg n should not be used for the binary logarithm, as it is instead reserved for the common logarithm log_{10} n.

== Applications ==
=== Information theory ===
The number of digits (bits) in the binary representation of a positive integer n is the integral part of 1 + log_{2} n, i.e.
$$\lfloor \log_2 n\rfloor + 1.$$

In information theory, the definition of the amount of self-information and information entropy is often expressed with the binary logarithm, corresponding to making the bit the fundamental unit of information. With these units, the Shannon–Hartley theorem expresses the information capacity of a channel as the binary logarithm of its signal-to-noise ratio, plus one. However, the natural logarithm and the nat are also used in alternative notations for these definitions.

=== Combinatorics ===
A 16-player single elimination tournament bracket with the structure of a complete binary tree. The height of the tree (number of rounds of the tournament) is the binary logarithm of the number of players, rounded up to an integer.

Although the natural logarithm is more important than the binary logarithm in many areas of pure mathematics such as number theory and mathematical analysis, the binary logarithm has several applications in combinatorics:

- Every binary tree with n leaves has height at least log_{2} n, with equality when n is a power of two and the tree is a complete binary tree. Relatedly, the Strahler number of a river system with n tributary streams is at most log_{2} n + 1.
- Every family of sets with n different sets has at least log_{2} n elements in its union, with equality when the family is a power set.
- Every partial cube with n vertices has isometric dimension at least log_{2} n, and has at most 1/2 n log_{2} n edges, with equality when the partial cube is a hypercube graph.
- According to Ramsey's theorem, every n-vertex undirected graph has either a clique or an independent set of size logarithmic in n. The precise size that can be guaranteed is not known, but the best bounds known on its size involve binary logarithms. In particular, all graphs have a clique or independent set of size at least 1/2 log_{2} n (1 − o(1)) and almost all graphs do not have a clique or independent set of size larger than 2 log_{2} n (1 + o(1)).
- From a mathematical analysis of the Gilbert–Shannon–Reeds model of random shuffles, one can show that the number of times one needs to shuffle an n-card deck of cards, using riffle shuffles, to get a distribution on permutations that is close to uniformly random, is approximately 3/2 log_{2} n. This calculation forms the basis for a recommendation that 52-card decks should be shuffled seven times.

=== Computational complexity ===
Binary search in a sorted array, an algorithm whose time complexity involves binary logarithms

The binary logarithm also frequently appears in the analysis of algorithms, not only because of the frequent use of binary number arithmetic in algorithms, but also because binary logarithms occur in the analysis of algorithms based on two-way branching. If a problem initially has n choices for its solution, and each iteration of the algorithm reduces the number of choices by a factor of two, then the number of iterations needed to select a single choice is again the integral part of log_{2} n. This idea is used in the analysis of several algorithms and data structures. For example, in binary search, the size of the problem to be solved is halved with each iteration, and therefore roughly log_{2} n iterations are needed to obtain a solution for a problem of size n. Similarly, a perfectly balanced binary search tree containing n elements has height log_{2}(n + 1) − 1.

The running time of an algorithm is usually expressed in big O notation, which is used to simplify expressions by omitting their constant factors and lower-order terms. Because logarithms in different bases differ from each other only by a constant factor, algorithms that run in O(log_{2} n) time can also be said to run in, say, O(log_{13} n) time. The base of the logarithm in expressions such as O(log n) or O(n log n) is therefore not important and can be omitted. However, for logarithms that appear in the exponent of a time bound, the base of the logarithm cannot be omitted. For example, O(2^{log_{2} n}) is not the same as O(2^{ln n}) because the former is equal to O(n) and the latter to O(n^{0.6931...}).

Algorithms with running time O(n log n) are sometimes called linearithmic. Some examples of algorithms with running time O(log n) or O(n log n) are:

- Average time quicksort and other comparison sort algorithms
- Searching in balanced binary search trees
- Exponentiation by squaring
- Longest increasing subsequence

Binary logarithms also occur in the exponents of the time bounds for some divide and conquer algorithms, such as the Karatsuba algorithm for multiplying n-bit numbers in time O(n^{log_{2} 3}), and the Strassen algorithm for multiplying n × n matrices in time O(n^{log_{2} 7}). The occurrence of binary logarithms in these running times can be explained by reference to the master theorem for divide-and-conquer recurrences.

=== Bioinformatics ===
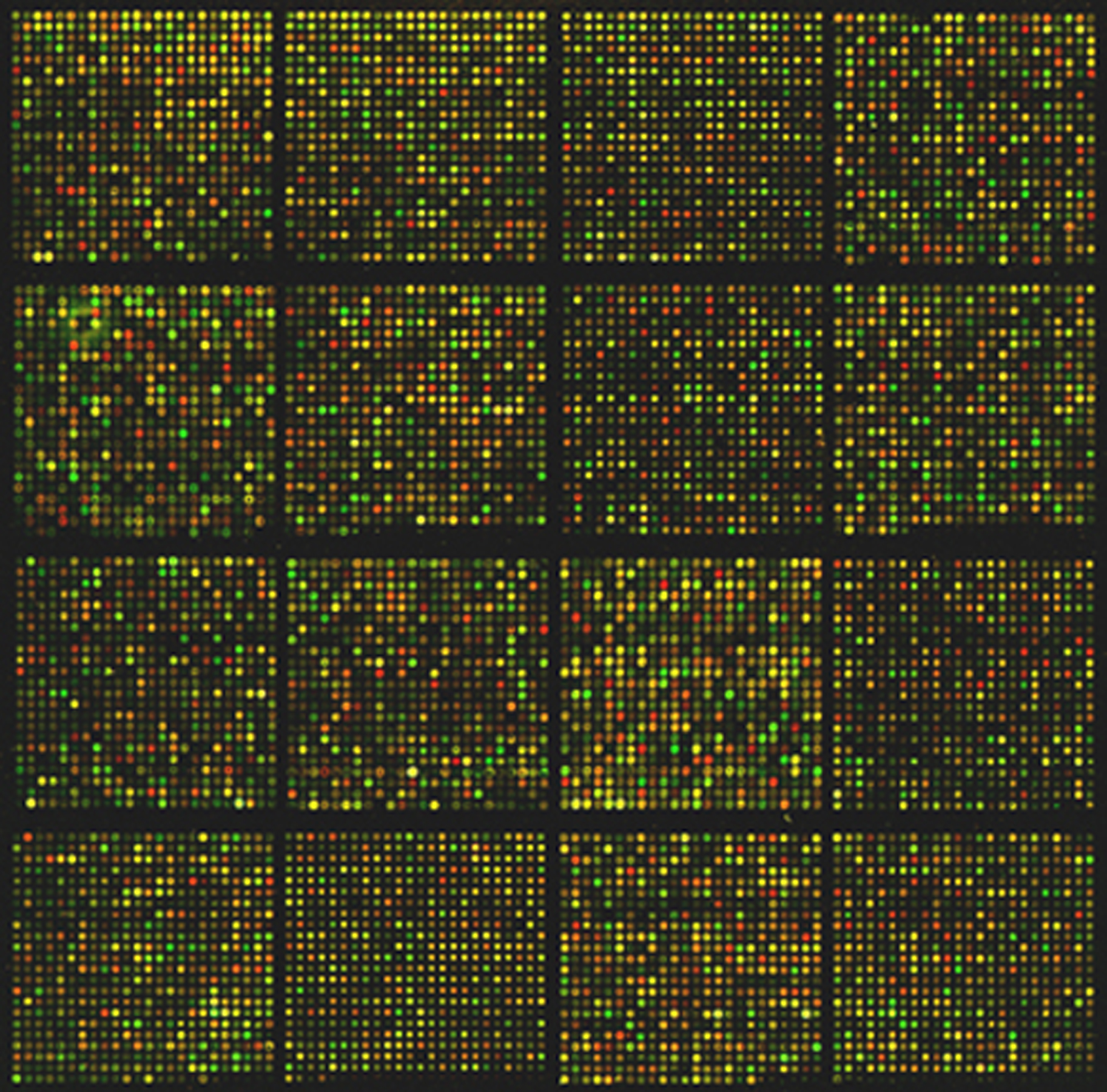
A microarray for approximately 8700 genes. The expression rates of these genes are compared using binary logarithms.

In bioinformatics, microarrays are used to measure how strongly different genes are expressed in a sample of biological material. Different rates of expression of a gene are often compared by using the binary logarithm of the ratio of expression rates: the log ratio of two expression rates is defined as the binary logarithm of the ratio of the two rates. Binary logarithms allow for a convenient comparison of expression rates: a doubled expression rate can be described by a log ratio of 1, a halved expression rate can be described by a log ratio of −1, and an unchanged expression rate can be described by a log ratio of zero, for instance.

Data points obtained in this way are often visualized as a scatterplot in which one or both of the coordinate axes are binary logarithms of intensity ratios, or in visualizations such as the MA plot and RA plot that rotate and scale these log ratio scatterplots.

=== Music theory ===
In music theory, the interval or perceptual difference between two tones is determined by the ratio of their frequencies. Intervals coming from rational number ratios with small numerators and denominators are perceived as particularly euphonious. The simplest and most important of these intervals is the octave, a frequency ratio of 2:1. The number of octaves by which two tones differ is the binary logarithm of their frequency ratio.

To study tuning systems and other aspects of music theory that require finer distinctions between tones, it is helpful to have a measure of the size of an interval that is finer than an octave and is additive (as logarithms are) rather than multiplicative (as frequency ratios are). That is, if tones x, y, and z form a rising sequence of tones, then the measure of the interval from x to y plus the measure of the interval from y to z should equal the measure of the interval from x to z. Such a measure is given by the cent, which divides the octave into 1200 equal intervals (12 semitones of 100 cents each). Mathematically, given tones with frequencies f_{1} and f_{2}, the number of cents in the interval from f_{1} to f_{2} is
$$\left|1200\log_2\frac{f_1}{f_2}\right|.$$
The millioctave is defined in the same way, but with a multiplier of 1000 instead of 1200.

=== Sports scheduling ===
In competitive games and sports involving two players or teams in each game or match, the binary logarithm indicates the number of rounds necessary in a single-elimination tournament required to determine a winner. For example, a tournament of 4 players requires log_{2} 4 = 2 rounds to determine the winner, a tournament of 32 teams requires log_{2} 32 = 5 rounds, etc. In this case, for n players/teams where n is not a power of 2, log_{2} n is rounded up since it is necessary to have at least one round in which not all remaining competitors play. For example, log_{2} 6 is approximately 2.585, which rounds up to 3, indicating that a tournament of 6 teams requires 3 rounds (either two teams sit out the first round, or one team sits out the second round). The same number of rounds is also necessary to determine a clear winner in a Swiss-system tournament.

=== Photography ===
In photography, exposure values are measured in terms of the binary logarithm of the amount of light reaching the film or sensor, in accordance with the Weber–Fechner law describing a logarithmic response of the human visual system to light. A single stop of exposure is one unit on a base-2 logarithmic scale. More precisely, the exposure value of a photograph is defined as
$$\log_2 \frac{N^2}{t}$$
where N is the f-number measuring the aperture of the lens during the exposure, and t is the number of seconds of exposure.

Binary logarithms (expressed as stops) are also used in densitometry, to express the dynamic range of light-sensitive materials or digital sensors.

== Calculation ==
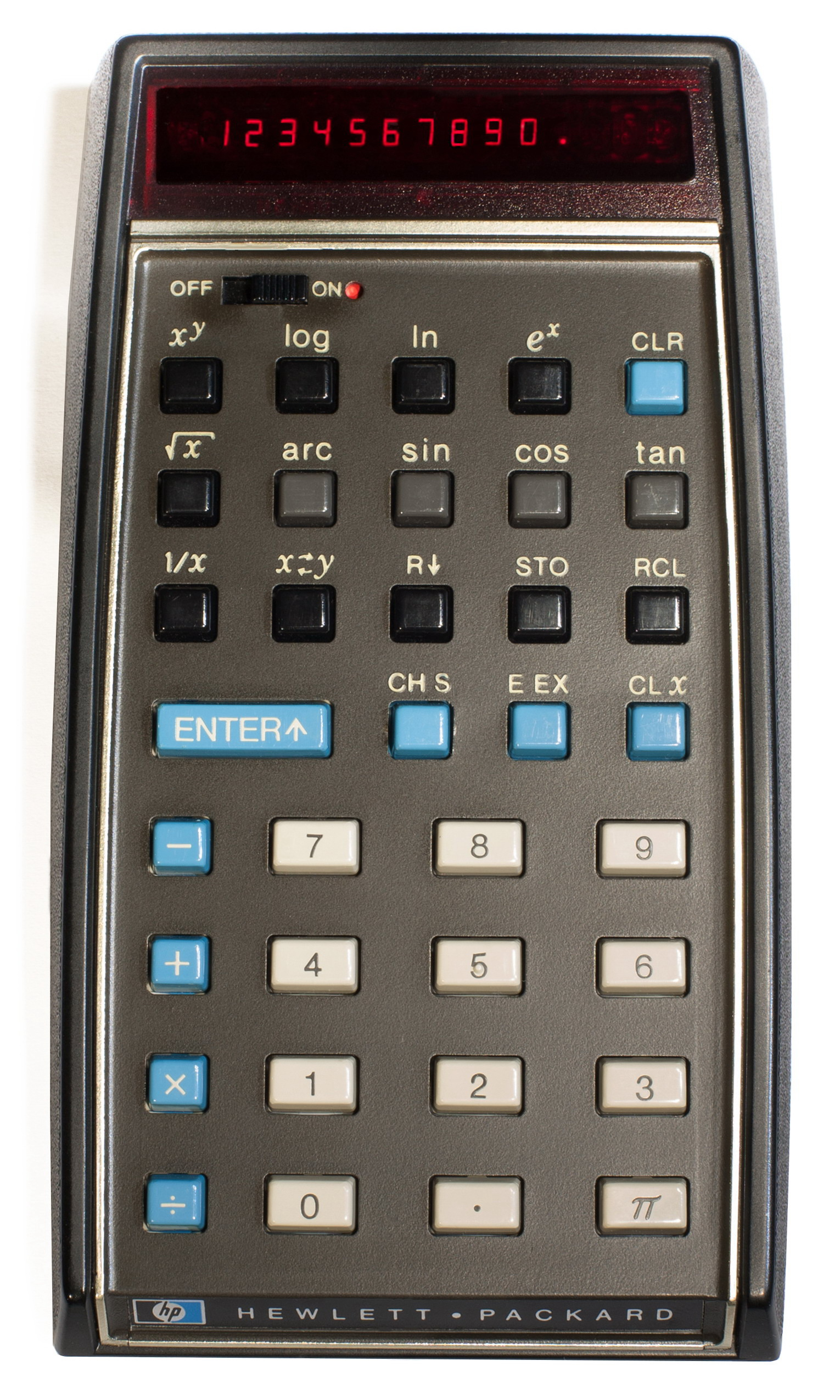
HP-35 scientific calculator (1972). The log and ln keys are in the top row; there is no log_{2} key.

=== Conversion from other bases ===
An easy way to calculate log_{2} n on calculators that do not have a log_{2} function is to use the natural logarithm (ln) or the common logarithm (log or log_{10}) functions, which are found on most scientific calculators. To change the logarithm base to 2 from e, 10, or any other base b, one can use the formulae:
$$\log_2 n = \frac{\ln n}{\ln 2} = \frac{\log_{10} n}{\log_{10} 2} = \frac{\log_{b} n}{\log_{b} 2}\,.$$
Approximately,
$$\log_2 n \approx 1.442695\ln n \approx 3.321928\log_{10} n\,.$$

=== Integer rounding ===
The binary logarithm can be made into a function from integers and to integers by rounding it up or down. These two forms of integer binary logarithm are related by this formula:
$$\lfloor \log_2(n) \rfloor = \lceil \log_2(n + 1) \rceil - 1, \text{ if }n \ge 1.$$
The definition can be extended by defining $\lfloor \log_2(0) \rfloor = -1$. Extended in this way, this function is related to the number of leading zeros of the 32-bit unsigned binary representation of x, nlz(x).
$$\lfloor \log_2(n) \rfloor = 31 - \operatorname{nlz}(n).$$

The integer binary logarithm can be interpreted as the zero-based index of the most significant 1 bit in the input. In this sense it is the complement of the find first set operation, which finds the index of the least significant 1 bit. Many hardware platforms include support for finding the number of leading zeros, or equivalent operations, which can be used to quickly find the binary logarithm. The fls and flsl functions in the Linux kernel and in some versions of the libc software library also compute the binary logarithm (rounded up to an integer, plus one).

=== Piecewise-linear approximation ===
For a number $x$ represented in floating point as $x=2^E(1+m)$, with integer exponent $E$ and mantissa $m$ in the range $0\le m<1$, the binary logarithm can be roughly approximated as $\log_2 x\approx E+m$. This approximation is exact at both ends of the range of mantissas but underestimates the logarithm in the middle of the range, reaching a maximum error of approximately 0.086 at a mantissa of approximately 0.44. It can be made more accurate by using a piecewise linear function of $m$, or more crudely by adding a constant correction term $\log_2 x\approx E+m+\sigma$. For instance choosing $\sigma\approx 0.043$ would halve the maximum error. The fast inverse square root algorithm uses this idea, with a different correction term that can be inferred to be $\sigma\approx 0.0450466$, by directly manipulating the binary representation of $x$ to multiply this approximate logarithm by $-\tfrac12$, obtaining a floating point value that approximates $1/\sqrt x$.

=== Iterative approximation ===
For a general positive real number, the binary logarithm may be computed in two parts. First, one computes the integer part, $\lfloor\log_2 x\rfloor$ (called the characteristic of the logarithm). This reduces the problem to one where the argument of the logarithm is in a restricted range, the interval [1, 2), simplifying the second step of computing the fractional part (the mantissa of the logarithm). For any x > 0, there exists a unique integer n such that 2^{n} ≤ x < 2^{n+1}, or equivalently 1 ≤ 2^{−n}x < 2. Now the integer part of the logarithm is simply n, and the fractional part is log_{2}(2^{−n}x). In other words:
$$\log_2 x = n + \log_2 y \quad\text{where } y = 2^{-n}x \text{ and } y \in [1,2)$$
For normalized floating-point numbers, the integer part is given by the floating-point exponent, and for integers it can be determined by performing a count leading zeros operation.

The fractional part of the result is log_{2} y and can be computed iteratively, using only elementary multiplication and division. The algorithm for computing the fractional part can be described in pseudocode as follows:

1. Start with a real number y in the half-open interval [1, 2). If y = 1, then the algorithm is done, and the fractional part is zero.
2. Otherwise, square y repeatedly until the result z lies in the interval [2, 4). Let m be the number of squarings needed. That is, z = y^{2^{m}} with m chosen such that z is in [2, 4).
3. Taking the logarithm of both sides and doing some algebra:
  $$\begin{align}
\log_2 z &= 2^m \log_2 y \\
\log_2 y &= \frac{ \log_2 z }{ 2^m } \\
&= \frac{ 1 + \log_2(z/2) }{ 2^m } \\
&= 2^{-m} + 2^{-m}\log_2(z/2).
\end{align}$$
4. Once again z/2 is a real number in the interval [1, 2). Return to step 1 and compute the binary logarithm of z/2 using the same method.

The result of this is expressed by the following recursive formulas, in which $m_i$ is the number of squarings required in the i-th iteration of the algorithm:
$$\begin{align}
\log_2 x &= n + 2^{-m_1} \left( 1 + 2^{-m_2} \left( 1 + 2^{-m_3} \left( 1 + \cdots \right)\right)\right) \\
&= n + 2^{-m_1} + 2^{-m_1-m_2} + 2^{-m_1-m_2-m_3} + \cdots
\end{align}$$

In the special case where the fractional part in step 1 is found to be zero, this is a finite sequence terminating at some point. Otherwise, it is an infinite series that converges according to the ratio test, since each term is strictly less than the previous one (since every m_{i} > 0). See Horner's method. For practical use, this infinite series must be truncated to reach an approximate result. If the series is truncated after the i-th term, then the error in the result is less than 2^{−(m_{1} + m_{2} + ⋯ + m_{i})}.

=== Software library support ===
The log2 function is included in the standard C mathematical functions. The default version of this function takes double precision arguments but variants of it allow the argument to be single-precision or to be a long double. In computing environments supporting complex numbers and implicit type conversion such as MATLAB the argument to the log2 function is allowed to be a negative number, returning a complex one.
