= Archease =

Superfamily of proteins

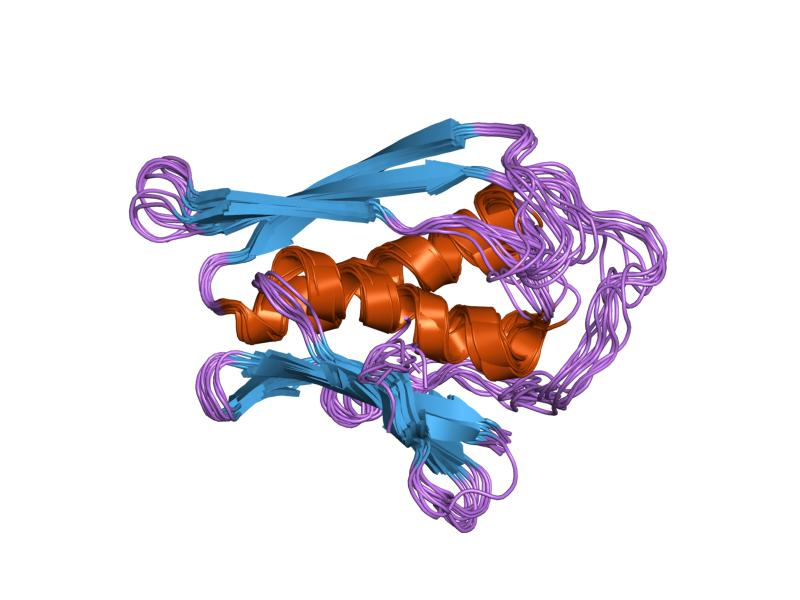
- Solution structure of the Methanobacterium thermoautotrophicum archease, protein 1598 (PDB ID: 1JW3).

Identifiers
- Symbol: Archease
- Pfam: PF01951
- InterPro: IPR002804
- SCOP2: 1jw3 / SCOPe / SUPFAM
Available protein structures:
- PDB: IPR002804 PF01951 (ECOD; PDBsum)
- AlphaFold: IPR002804; PF01951

In molecular biology, the archeases are a conserved superfamily of proteins represented in all three domains of life. Archeases are typically small proteins, 16-20 kDa in size. Archease genes are generally located adjacent to genes encoding proteins involved in DNA or RNA processing and have therefore been predicted to be modulators or chaperones involved in DNA or RNA metabolism. Many of the roles of archeases remain to be established experimentally.

One of the archeases from the hyperthermophile Pyrococcus abyssi has been found to enhance the function of a methyltransferase. The gene encoding the archease (PAB1946) is located in a bicistronic operon immediately upstream from a second open reading frame (PAB1947), which encodes a tRNA m5C methyltransferase. The methyltransferase catalyses m5C formation at several cytosine's within tRNAs with preference for C49. The archease increases the specificity of the methyltransferase reaction. The archease exists in monomeric and oligomeric states, with only the oligomeric forms able to bind the methyltransferase. Binding prevents aggregation and hinders dimerisation of the methyltransferase-tRNA complex.

Structural analysis of the archease from Methanobacterium thermoautotrophicum supports function of this family of archeases as chaperones. The M. thermoautotrophicum archease shows homology to heat shock protein 33, a chaperone protein that inhibits the aggregation of partially denatured proteins.

Human archease is found in complex with the RNA ligase RTCB. It is essential to the RTCB catalytic cycle, serving as a guanylylation activation factor.
