= RNA ligase 1 =

Protein-coding gene in humans

RLIG1
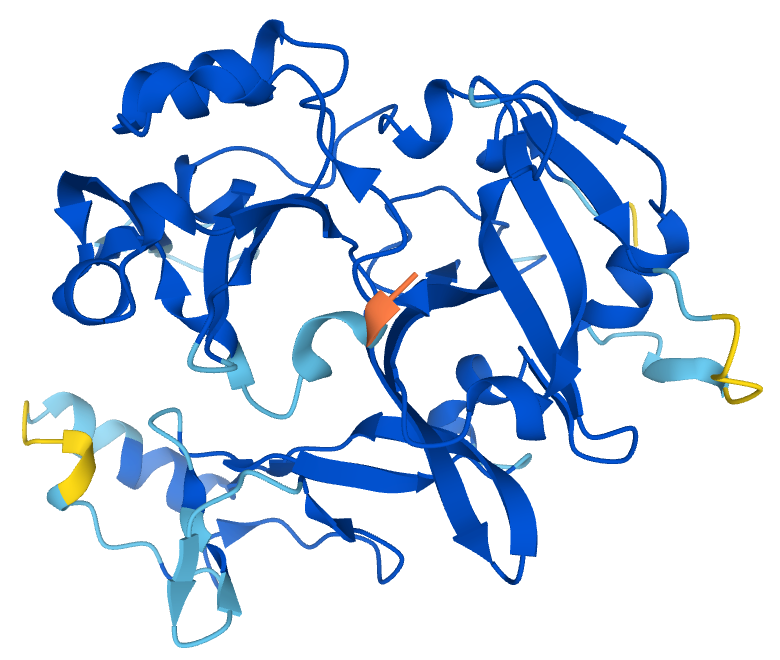

Identifiers
- Aliases: RLIG1, chromosome 12 open reading frame 29, LOC91298, FLJ38158, MGC102978, DKFZp313K0436, DKFZp434N2030, DKFZp686L04169, C12orf29, RNA 5'-Phosphate And 3'-OH Ligase 1, RNA ligase 1
- External IDs: MGI: 1921197; GeneCards: RLIG1
Enzyme activity
EC #	BRENDA	ExPASy	KEGG	MetaCyc
6.5.1.3	↗	↗	↗	↗

Gene location (Human)
Chr.	Chromosome 12 (human)
Band	12q21.32	Start	88,033,846 bp
Band	12q21.32	End	88,050,160 bp

Gene location (Mouse)
Chr.	Chromosome 10 (mouse)
Band	10|10 D1	Start	100,408,127 bp
Band	10|10 D1	End	100,426,285 bp
RNA expression pattern
Bgee	Human / Mouse (ortholog); Top expressed in: endothelial cell; Brodmann area 23; oocyte; skin of thigh; oral cavity; pars reticulata; palpebral conjunctiva; secondary oocyte; human penis; entorhinal cortex / Top expressed in: spermatocyte; spermatid; cumulus cell; lobe of cerebellum; neural layer of retina; facial motor nucleus; genital tubercle; cerebellar vermis; intercostal muscle; habenula; More reference expression data
BioGPS	n/a
Orthologs
Databases	NCBI: entry; OMA: entry
Species	Human	Mouse
Entrez	91298	68281
Ensembl	ENSG00000133641	ENSMUSG00000046567
UniProt	Q8N999	Q8BHN7
RefSeq (mRNA)	NM_001009894	NM_175128
RefSeq (protein)	NP_001009894	NP_780337
Location (UCSC)	Chr 12: 88.03 – 88.05 Mb	Chr 10: 100.41 – 100.43 Mb
PubMed search
- Wikidata
View/Edit Human	View/Edit Mouse

RNA ligase 1 is a enzyme that in humans is encoded by the gene RLIG1 (previously C12orf29). RNA ligase 1 functions as an RNA ligase, and participates in the biological response to reactive oxygen species.

== Gene ==
The RLIG1 gene is located on the positive strand at 12q21.32 in humans (p = short arm, q = long arm). It has 7 exons and 6 introns. The gene spans from 88,035,536 to 88,050,160 with 14,645 base pairs. There is only one isoform of the transcript, which is the transcript of this gene itself.

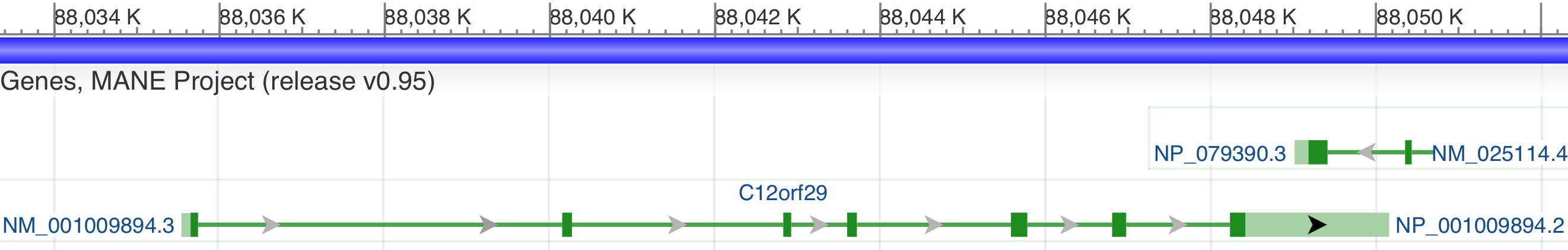
An overview of human RLIG1 gene transcript from NCBI Gene.

Neighbor genes around human RLIG1 are: C12orf50 (-), RNA5SP364 (+), LOC107984542 (-), LOC100420011 (+), CEP290 (-).

Neighbor genes of human RLIG1 from NCBI Gene.

== Expression ==
The RLIG1 gene is ubiquitously expressed in 27 tissues. It is expressed a little bit higher in esophagus, skin, brain and bone marrow. It showed increased expression in several tumor cells and tissues such as in colorectal tumor tissue, in ovarian cancer epithelial cells, and in hyperplastic enlarged lobular units epithelial cells.

== Protein ==
RLIG1 protein has 325 amino acids. The molecular weight is 37.5 kD, and the isoelectric point is 6.6 pH. It is not a membrane protein, and it stays in the cytosol. For the content of the amino acids, compared with other human proteins, RLIG1 is high in asparagine and histidine, but it is low in alanine. There are no validated domains or motifs. It has a short repetitive structures of "INGNP", but it is not conserved in orthologs. However, there are two highly conserved predicted motifs. They are the protease caspase 3 and 7 cleavage motif, and the mitogen-activated protein kinase (MAPK) docking motif. There are several predicted protein kinase c phosphorylation sites and casein kinase II phosphorylation sites, but they are not conserved in orthologs.

         1  MKRLGSVQRK MPCVFVTEVK EEPSSKREHQ PFKVLATETV SHKALDADIY SAIPTEKVDG
        61  TCCYVTTYKD QPYLWARLDR KPNKQAEKRF KNFLHSKENP KEFFWNVEED FKPAPECWIP
       121  AKETEQINGN PVPDENGHIP GWVPVEKNNK QYCWHSSVVN YEFEIALVLK HHPDDSGLLE
       181  ISAVPLSDLL EQTLELIGTN INGNPYGLGS KKHPLHLLIP HGAFQIRNLP SLKHNDLVSW
       241  FEDCKEGKIE GIVWHCSDGC LIKVHRHHLG LCWPIPDTYM NSRPVIINMN LNKCDSAFDI
       301  KCLFNHFLKI DNQKFVRLKD IIFDV

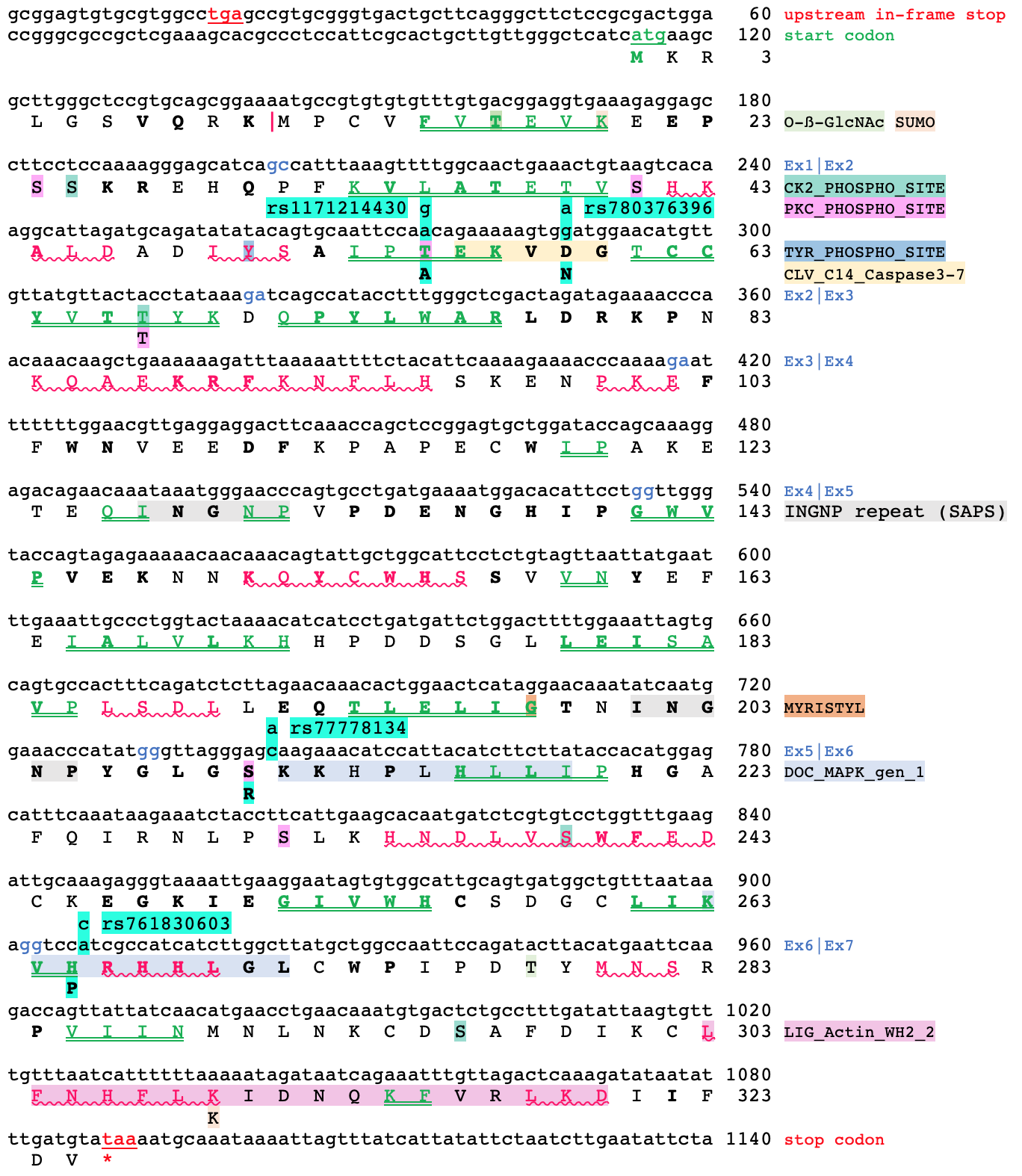
Some SNP and predicted post-translational modification of RLIG1 protein. (Green double underline represent beta-sheet. Pink squiggly underline represents alpha-helix. Bolded letters represent the conserved amino acids in distant orthologs)

== Protein interaction ==
NCL and LRRK2 was experimentally determined to interacted with RLIG1. NCL physically interacted with RLIG1, and LRRK2 was associated with RLIG1. There are several predicted protein interactions for RLIG1. The interactions with PNN, OTUD68, and ACTR6 were predicted by co-expression.

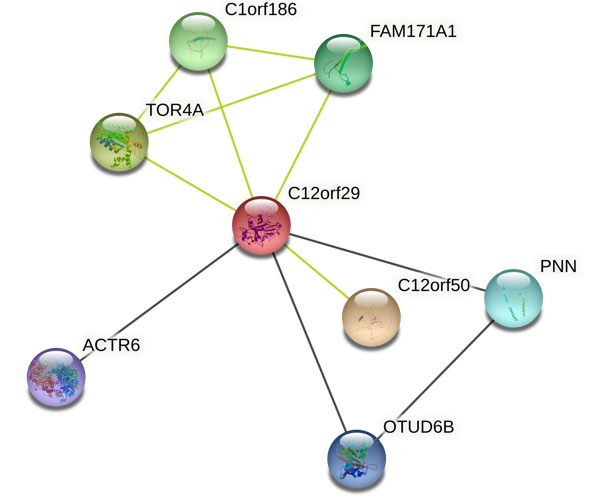
Predicted protein interaction of RLIG1 by STRING. (Green line represent predicted relation by text-mining, black line represents predicted relation by co-expression)

== Homology and evolution ==
Orthologs of RLIG1 protein are found within the mammals, birds, reptiles, amphibians, fishes, and invertebrates. The length and contents of the protein sequence was highly conserved in the selected orthologs (table below). It is important to notice that the RLIG1 protein was only found in mollusks, tunicate, and cephalochordata in invertebrates, but it was not found in insects, arachnids, crustaceans, corals, worms, jellyfishes, sponges within the other groups in invertebrates. RLIG1 protein was not found in bacteria, fungi, and viruses. There is no paralog for RLIG1 protein. The mutation rate of RLIG1 was close to that of fibrinogen alpha chain. The human's RLIG1 protein was more closely related to the sheep's ortholog than to the mouse's ortholog. The invertebrates RLIG1 orthologs were mostly distantly related to the human protein.

=== Ortholog table ===
Selected Orthologs Table of RLIG1 Protein
Sequence Number	Ortholog Group	Genius and Species	Taxonomic Group	Common Name	Time Since Divergence (Estimated MYA)	Accession Number	Sequence Length (aa)	Sequence Identity	Sequence Similarity
1	Mammals	Homo sapiens	Primates	Human	0	NP_001009894.2	325	100%	100%
2	Mammals	Mus musculus	Rodentia	House Mouse	90	NP_780337.2	327	84%	90%
3	Mammals	Ovis aries	Artiodactyla	Sheep	96	NP_001186723.1	325	91%	96%
4	Mammals	Phascolarctos cinereus	Diprotodontia	Koala	159	XP_020849155.1	325	86%	92%
5	Mammals	Ornithorhynchus anatinus	Monotremata	Platypus	177	XP_028934667.1	326	78%	89%
6	Aves	Gallus gallus	Galliformes	Chicken	312	XP_040518235.1	324	75%	86%
7	Aves	Cygnus atratus	Anseriformes	Black Swan	312	XP_035407728.1	324	75%	86%
8	Aves	Calypte anna	Apodiformes	Anna's Hummingbird	312	XP_030312194.1	324	75%	87%
9	Reptiles	Crocodylus porosus	Crocodylia	Australian Saltwater Crocodile	312	XP_019400824.1	323	76%	88%
10	Reptiles	Zootoca vivipara	Squamata	Common Lizard	312	XP_034983157.1	325	71%	85%
11	Reptiles	Python bivittatus	Squamata	Burmese Python	312	XP_007429130.1	323	70%	84%
12	Reptiles	Dermochelys coriacea	Testudines	Leatherback Sea Turtle	312	XP_038257651.1	325	78%	90%
13	Amphibians	Bufo bufo	Anura	Common Toad	351.8	XP_040264560.1	324	63%	77%
14	Amphibians	Rhinatrema bivittatum	Gymnophiona	Two-lined Caecilian	351.8	XP_029457527.1	335	66%	82%
15	Fishes	Danio rerio	Cypriniformes	Zebrafish	435	NP_001008606.1	325	60%	79%
16	Fishes	Rhincodon typus	Orectolobiformes	Whale Shark	473	XP_020369226.1	330	56%	73%
17	Invertebrates	Styela clava	Stolidobranchia	Asian Tunicate	676	XP_039256956.1	351	44%	59%
18	Invertebrates	Branchiostoma floridae	Amphioxiformes	Florida Lancelet	684	XP_035678444.1	341	43%	62%
19	Invertebrates	Pecten maximus	Pectinida	King Scallop	797	XP_033752428.1	347	44%	62%
20	Invertebrates	Crassostrea gigas	Ostreida	Pacific Oyster	797	XP_034327602.1	357	41%	59%

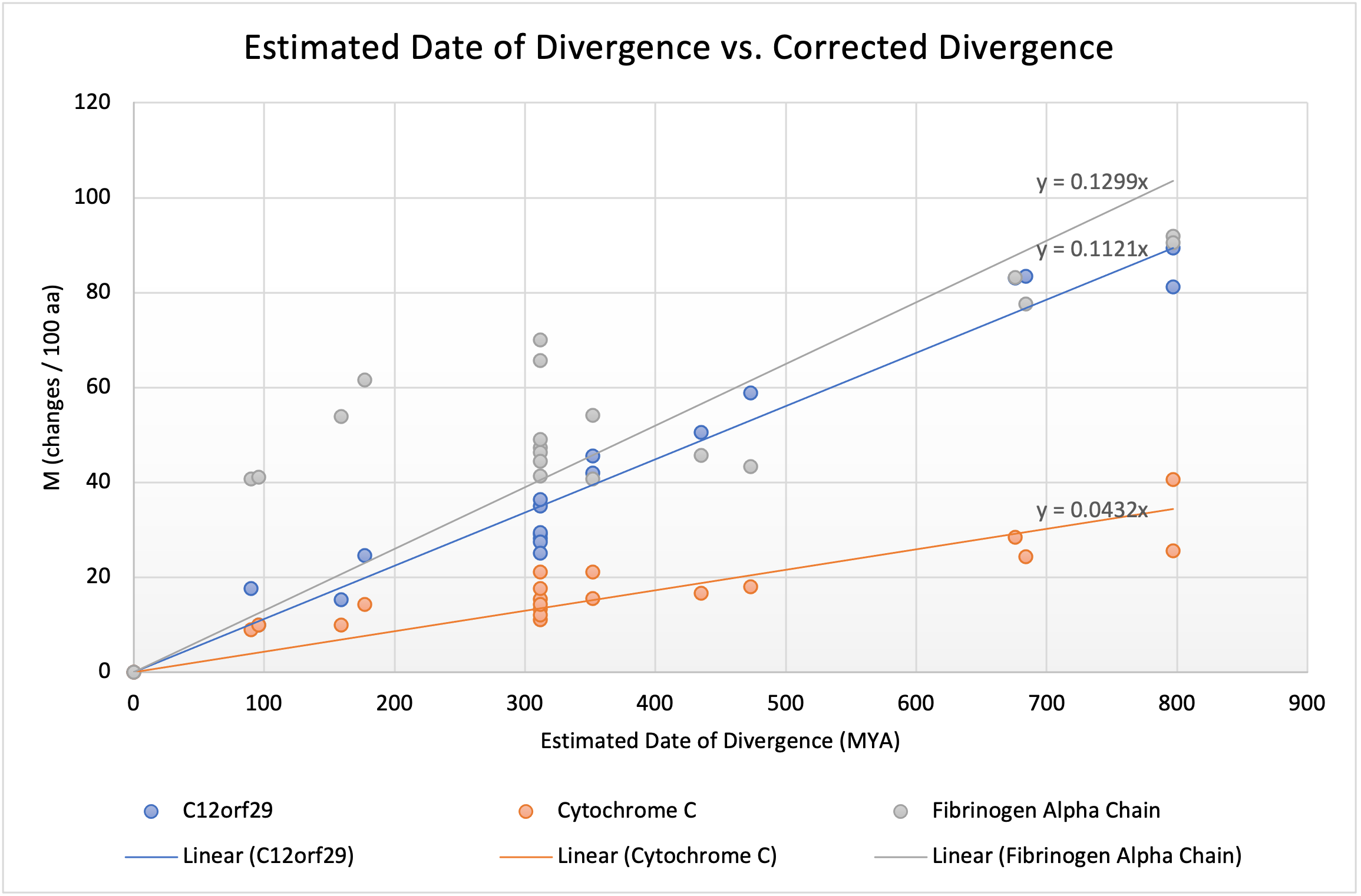
Estimated date of divergence and the corrected divergence of orthologous protein sequence. The average mutation rate of RLIG1 protein, cytochrome c protein (slow-evolving), and fibrinogen alpha chain protein (fast-evolving) are estimated by the linear regression.

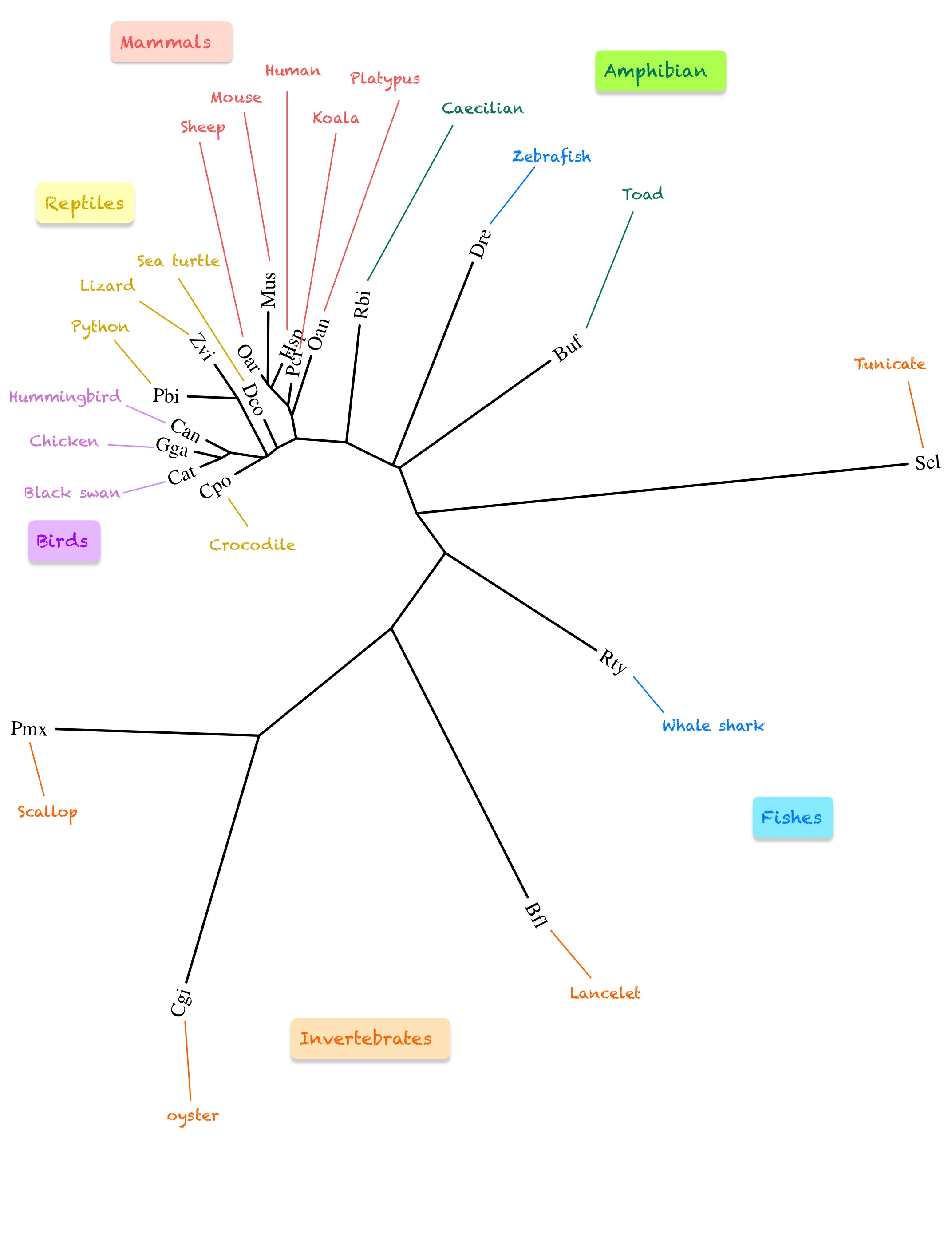
Unrooted phylogenetic tree of RLIG1 orthologs in 20 vertebrates and invertebrates.

== In research ==
=== In bone ===
In sheep (Ovis aries) bone, RLIG1 protein has a high expression in mandible osteoblasts cells (mOB cells) and periodontal ligament cells (PDLCs). It has a relatively low but still noticeable amount of expression in prostate cancer cell line (PC3). It is observed to be expressed in the extracellular matrix (ECM) around the mOB cells, and it is suggested that RLIG1 protein is imported and embedded into ECM from mOB cells. RLIG1 are also discovered in the area around mineralization zone of the growth plate and calcified cartilage of trabecular bone in rats. RLIG1 is a potential structural protein in skeletal tissue with a role in the extracellular matrix of articular and growth cartilage. It might be decorated with glycosaminoglycans, thus a potential proteoglycan.

=== Cancer ===
RLIG1 is expressed in the most common subtypes (osteoblastic type, mixed osteoblastic/chondroblastic type, and chondroblastic type) of osteosarcoma (OS) patients and humanized OS model. It has a role in promoting the development of the musculoskeletal system. RLIG1 has a significantly high expression in the tumor cells, but its expression is not associated with the proliferation of the tumors. OS located at the jaw or temporal regions has a statistically significant expression of RLIG1 than OS in the extremity or trunk region. C12orf29 expression has a strong positive correlation with the expression of Ki67 gene (a biomarker for tumor proliferation).

=== KLF9 ===
The mRNA expression of RLIG1 protein is increased with Krüppel-like factor 9 (KLF9) suppression.KLF9 is a transcriptional regulator of uterine endometrial cell proliferation, adhesion, and differentiation, which are essential processes for pregnancy success. KLF9 expression is suppressed during tumorigenesis.
