= Wolfgang Huber (scientist) =

German computational biologist

- Education: University of Freiburg
- Scientific career
- Fields: Computational biology
- Workplaces: European Molecular Biology Laboratory
- Thesis: (1998)

Wolfgang Huber is a German computational biologist who serves as group leader for the Huber Group at the European Molecular Biology Laboratory (EMBL), where he is also a senior scientist. He is a founding member of Bioconductor and, alongside Sascha Dietrich, serves as the joint head of the Molecular Medicine Partnership Unit's group Systems Medicine of Cancer Drugs.

== Awards and honours ==
In 2021, Huber was elected as a Fellow of the International Society for Computational Biology.
