= Matthias Hentze =

German scientist (born 1960)

- Born: 25 January 1960 (age 66); Wiedenbrück, Germany
- Education: Westfälische Wilhelms-Universität Münster
- Scientific career
- Fields: Molecular Biology, RNA-binding proteins
- Workplaces: EMBL (Heidelberg, Germany)
- Thesis: "Influence of amino acid analogs on maturation, transport and stability of cathepsin D in human skin fibroblasts" (1984)
- Website: www.embl.de

Matthias Werner Hentze (born 25 January 1960) is a German scientist. He is the Director of the European Molecular Biology Laboratory (EMBL). and co-founder of the Molecular Medicine Partnership Unit (MMPU).

== Early life and education ==
Matthias Hentze studied medicine in the UK at the medical schools at the universities of Southampton, Oxford, Glasgow and Cambridge, and in Germany at the Westfälische Wilhelms-Universität, Münster from which he qualified in 1984. In the same year, he received his M.D. degree for a dissertation on the role of glycosylation in lysosomal enzyme expression with Kurt von Figura as his advisor.

After a short phase of clinical work, Hentze became a postdoctoral fellow at the National Institutes of Health (Bethesda, Maryland, USA) in 1985, having been awarded a fellowship by the German Research Foundation (DFG). In 1989, he joined the European Molecular Biology Laboratory in Heidelberg as an independent group leader. In 1990, he obtained the Habilitation from the Ruprecht-Karls University in Heidelberg and was appointed Dean of the EMBL International Ph.D. Programme in 1996.

== Career ==
Since 1996, Hentze has held positions in EMBL's scientific administration, initially as Dean of the EMBL International PhD Programme and in the establishment and expansion of EMBL's internal and external training programs. He played a key role in the conceptualisation and establishment of the Advanced Training Centre (ATC) in Heidelberg. He has also overseen the development of EMBL's fundraising and alumni programs, and established EMBL's first Bioethics Committee, which he chaired from 2004 to 2020.

Together with Andreas Kulozik of the Medical Faculty of Heidelberg University, Hentze co-founded the Molecular Medicine Partnership Unit (MMPU) in 2002 and served as its co-director until May 2025.

In 2005, Hentze became Associate Director of the EMBL and Professor for Molecular Medicine at the University of Heidelberg. In 2013, Hentze was appointed Director of EMBL.

Hentze founded the Environmental Research Initiative (ERI) in 2020. ERI connects private donors with the scientific potential of researchers at EMBL.

Hentze serves or served on the editorial boards of Molecular Cell, RNA, EMBO Molecular Medicine, Trends in Biochemical Sciences, Journal of Molecular Medicine, BMC Molecular Biology, and Wiley Interdisciplinary Reviews: RNA.

Hentze is or was a member of the Scientific Advisory Board and Board of Trustees of the Max Delbrück Center for Molecular Medicine (Berlin, Germany), the scientific advisory board of the Berlin Institute of Health (BIH/BIG), the Istituto Nazionale Genetica Molecolare (INGM), Milan, Italy, the Centenary Institute, Sydney, Australia, the KAUST Center for Smart Health, the International Scientific Advisory Board (ISAB) "RNA for Therapy", CEITEC, Brno, Czech Republic, and the Cold Spring Harbor Conferences Asia. Furthermore, Hentze is the scientific co-founder of Anadys Pharmaceuticals, San Diego, USA.

== Research ==
Hentze's research focuses on RNA biology and RNA-binding proteins. In 1987, Hentze and his colleagues discovered iron-responsive elements as first example of an RNA element regulating the translation of mammalian mRNA into proteins. Hentze's research group has paved the way for understanding translational control (RNA-binding proteins, microRNAs) whose significance for developmental biology, brain function, carcinogenesis and other diseases has in the meantime become widely recognized. Moreover, he has made key discoveries in the area of iron metabolism and disease.

In 2010, Hentze proposed the concept of REM Networks, a new interconnection between metabolism and gene expression on the basis of RNA-binding proteins. The research project was awarded the ERC Advanced Investigator Grant by the European Research Council in 2011. Work following this hypothesis led to the development of the "RNA Interactome Capture" technique and to the discovery of hundreds of formerly unknown RNA-binding proteins in the cells of living organisms from human to yeast, including more than 100 metabolic enzymes. Hentze and his colleagues also discovered new RNA-binding motives of proteins which they unraveled using the newly developed method called "RBDmap".

In 2019, they described the concept of riboregulation. They found out that the autophagy receptor protein p62 is directly regulated by a small RNA, vtRNA1-1, and that the small RNA directly interferes with protein-protein interactions between p62 monomers. They reported a new form of riboregulation in 2022: RNA binds to the catalytic center of the human enzyme enolase-1 and inhibits its glycolytic activity. Currently, their research focuses on how widely biological processes are riboregulated, and how riboregulation determines cell metabolism, differentiation and malignant processes.

== Honors and awards ==
- 1997 — Elected member of the European Molecular Biology Organization (EMBO)
- 2000 — Gottfried Wilhelm Leibniz Prize of the German Research Foundation (DFG)
- 2006 — Elected Member of the German National Academy of Sciences Leopoldina
- 2007 — Lautenschläger Research Prize of the University of Heidelberg
- 2012 — ERC Advanced Investigator Grant of the European Research Council
- 2015 — RNA Society, Elected Director (2016–2017)
- 2015 — Feodor Lynen Medal and Lecture, German Society for Biochemistry and Molecular Biology
- 2016 — Elected Corresponding Member (FAA), Australian Academy of Science
- 2016 — Heidelberg Molecular Life Science Investigator Award
- 2016 — Elected Member, Academia Europaea (MAE)
- 2017 — Doctor of Science, honoris causa, Australian National University, Canberra, Australia
- 2018 — Ilse and Helmut Wachter Award of the Medical University Innsbruck
- 2018 — International Honorary Member of the American Academy of Arts and Sciences
- 2019 — Pro Scientia Award of the Eckhart-Buddecke-Foundation, Münster, Germany
- 2020 — RNA Society Lifetime Achievement Award
- 2023 — The Centenary Award of the Biochemical Society
- 2025 — Marcel Simon Award, International BioIron Society, together with L. Kühn, E. Leibold and T. Rouault
- 2025 — Otto Warburg Medal, German Society for Biochemistry and Molecular Biology (GBM)

== Publications ==
Hentze is (co-)author of textbooks about Molecular Medicine and has published over 300 scientific original contributions.
