= Molecular Medicine Partnership Unit =

Biological/medical alliance

The Molecular Medicine Partnership Unit is an alliance between the European Molecular Biology Laboratory and the Medical Faculties of the University of Heidelberg. Its primary aim is to uncover the molecular basis of disease and to speed the transformation of biomedical discoveries into personalized medicine strategies.

Founded in 2002, the Molecular Medicine Partnership Unit (MMPU) comprises nine inter-disciplinary research teams. It is co-directed by Prof. Carsten Müller-Tidow from the Department of Internal Medicine V Hematology, Oncology and Rheumatology at the University of Heidelberg and Dr. Wolfgang Huber (scientist) from the European Molecular Biology Laboratory, and is housed in the Otto-Meyerhof-Research Center on the Medical Campus of the University of Heidelberg, Germany.

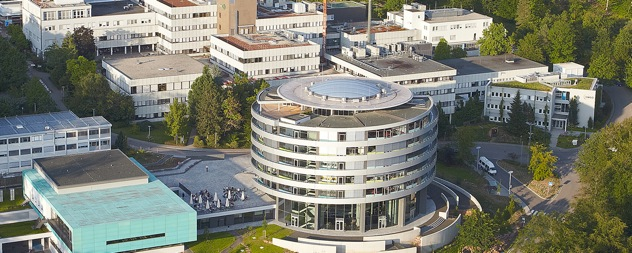
European Molecular Biology Laboratory campus in Heidelberg. Photo: Photolab EMBL

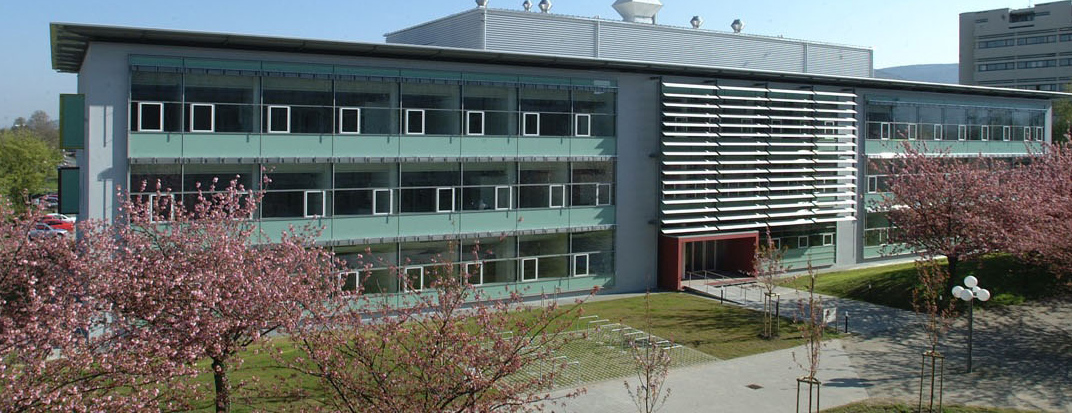
Otto-Meyerhof-Research Center in Heidelberg. Photo: Medienzentrum Universitätsklinikum Heidelberg

== Research themes ==
Research themes place emphasis on common diseases as well as on rare diseases with a particular medical need.

In 2025 more than 120 international scientists work on the following nine research themes:

- ‘Chronic Pain and Homeostasis’ headed by Rohini Kuner, Robert Prevedel and Jan Siemens.
- ‘ECM Brain’ headed by Alba Diz-Muñoz and Michael Platten
- ‘Heart Development and Diseases’ headed by Eileen Furlong and Johannes Backs.
- ‘Iron homeostasis in health and disease’ headed by Martina Muckenthaler and Matthias Hentze.
- ‘Microbiota Drug Metabolism and Cancer Therapy’ headed by Matthias Ebert, Tianzuo Zhan and Michael Zimmermann.
- ‘Molecular Pediatric Oncology’ headed by Jan Korbel and Andreas Kulozik.
- ‘Stem Cell–Niche Networks in Ageing and Disease’ headed by Caroline Pabst, Judith Zaugg and Carsten Müller–Tidow.
- ‘Systems Medicine of Cancer Therapies’ headed by Sascha Dietrich, Wolfgang Huber (scientist) and Junyan Lu.
- ‘Translational RNA Biology’ headed by Andreas Kulozik and Matthias Hentze.

== Selected recent publications ==
- Horvat, NK.; Chocarro, S.; Marques, O.; et al. (2024). "Superparamagnetic Iron Oxide Nanoparticles Reprogram the Tumor Microenvironment and Reduce Lung Cancer Regrowth after Crizotinib Treatment". ACS Nano. 18 (17): 11025–11041. doi:10.1021/acsnano.3c08335. PMC 11064219. PMID 38626916.
- Zhou, Y.; Ray, PS.; Stein, F.; et al. (2024). "Systematic analysis of RNA-binding proteins identifies targetable therapeutic vulnerabilities in osteosarcoma". Nat. Commun. 15 (1): 2810. doi:10.1038/s41467-024-47031-y. PMC 10984982. PMID 38561347.
- Mathioudaki, A.; Wang, X.; Sedloev, DN.; et al. (2024). "The remission status of AML patients post alloSCT is associated with a distinct single-cell bone marrow T cell signature". Blood. 143 (13): 1269–1281. doi:10.1182/blood.2023021815. PMC 10997908. PMID 38197505.
- Marty-Lombardi, S; Lu, S; Ambroziak, W; et al. (2024). "Neuron–astrocyte metabolic coupling facilitates spinal plasticity and maintenance of inflammatory pain". Nature Metabolism. 6 (3): 494–513. doi:10.1038/s42255-024-01001-2. PMC 10963271. PMID 38443593.
- Roider, T; Baertsch, MA; Fitzgerald, D; et al. (2024). "Multimodal and spatially resolved profiling identifies distinct patterns of T cell infiltration in nodal B cell lymphoma entities". Nature Cell Biology. 26 (3): 478–489. doi:10.1038/s41556-024-01358-2. PMC 10940160. PMID 38379051.
- Gangadharan, V; Zheng, H; Taberner, FJ; et al. (2022). "Neuropathic pain caused by miswiring and abnormal end organ targeting". Nature. 606 (7912): 780–96. Bibcode:2022Natur.606..137G. doi:10.1038/s41586-022-04777-z. PMC 9159955. PMID 35614217.
- Betge, J.; Rindtorff, N.; Sauer, J.; et al. (2022). "The drug-induced phenotypic landscape of colorectal cancer organoids". Nature Communications. 13 (1): 3135. Bibcode:2022NatCo..13.3135B. doi:10.1038/s41467-022-30722-9. PMC 9170716. PMID 35668108.
- Vinchi, F; Porto, G; Simmelbauer, A; et al. (2020). "Atherosclerosis is aggravated by iron overload and ameliorated by dietary and pharmacological iron restriction". Eur Heart J. 41 (28): 2681–2695. doi:10.1093/eurheartj/ehz112. PMID 30903157.
- Zhan, T; Ambrosi, G; Wandmacher, AM; et al. (2019). "MEK inhibitors activate Wnt signalling and induce stem cell plasticity in colorectal cancer". Nature Communications. 10 (1): 2197. Bibcode:2019NatCo..10.2197Z. doi:10.1038/s41467-019-09898-0. PMC 6522484. PMID 31097693.
