= RNA ligase (ATP) =

Identifiers
- EC no.: 6.5.1.3
- CAS no.: 37353-39-2

Databases
- BRENDA: enzyme data
- ExPASy: NiceZyme view
- KEGG: enzyme entry
- MetaCyc: metabolic pathway
- Rhea: reactions
- PDB structures: RCSB PDB PDBe PDBsum
- Gene Ontology: AmiGO / QuickGO
Search
- PMC: articles
- PubMed: articles
- NCBI: proteins

In enzymology, an RNA ligase (ATP) (EC 6.5.1.3) is an enzyme that catalyzes the chemical reaction ATP + (ribonucleotide)n + (ribonucleotide)m $\rightleftharpoons$ AMP + diphosphate + (ribonucleotide)n^{+}m. Their three substrates are ATP, (ribonucleotide)n and (ribonucleotide)m, and their three products are AMP, diphosphate and (ribonucleotide)n+m. In humans, the enzyme RNA ligase 1 is the main example of an enzyme that is known to catalyze this reaction (at least in vitro).

These enzymes belong to the family of ligases, specifically those forming phosphoric-ester bonds. The systematic name of this enzyme class is poly(ribonucleotide):poly(ribonucleotide) ligase (AMP-forming). Other names in common use include polyribonucleotide synthase (ATP), RNA ligase, polyribonucleotide ligase and ribonucleic ligase.

As of late 2007, two structures have been solved for this class of enzymes, with PDB accession codes PDB: 1VDX and PDB: 2C5U.
