= Microarray =

Small-scale two-dimensional array of samples on a solid support

A Venn diagram outlining and contrasting some aspects of the fields of bio-MEMS, lab-on-a-chip, μTAS

A microarray is a multiplex lab-on-a-chip. Its purpose is to simultaneously detect the expression of thousands of biological interactions. It is a two-dimensional array on a solid substrate—usually a glass slide or silicon thin-film cell—that assays (tests) large amounts of biological material using high-throughput screening miniaturized, multiplexed and parallel processing and detection methods. The concept and methodology of microarrays was first introduced and illustrated in antibody microarrays (also referred to as antibody matrix) by Tse Wen Chang in 1983 in a scientific publication and a series of patents. The "gene chip" industry started to grow significantly after the 1995 Science Magazine article by the Ron Davis and Pat Brown labs at Stanford University. With the establishment of companies, such as Affymetrix, Agilent, Applied Microarrays, Arrayjet, Illumina, and others, the technology of DNA microarrays has become the most sophisticated and the most widely used, while the use of protein, peptide and carbohydrate microarrays is expanding.

Types of microarrays include:

- DNA microarrays, such as cDNA microarrays, oligonucleotide microarrays, BAC microarrays and SNP microarrays
- MMChips, for surveillance of microRNA populations
- Protein microarrays
- Peptide microarrays, for detailed analyses or optimization of protein–protein interactions
- Tissue microarrays
- Cellular microarrays (also called transfection microarrays)
- Chemical compound microarrays
- Antibody microarrays
- Glycan arrays (carbohydrate arrays)
- Phenotype microarrays
- Reverse phase protein lysate microarrays, microarrays of lysates or serum
- Interferometric reflectance imaging sensor (IRIS)

People in the field of CMOS biotechnology are developing new kinds of microarrays. Once fed magnetic nanoparticles, individual cells can be moved independently and simultaneously on a microarray of magnetic coils. A microarray of nuclear magnetic resonance microcoils is under development.

== Fabrication and operation of microarrays ==
A large number of technologies underlie the microarray platform, including the material substrates, spotting of biomolecular arrays, and the microfluidic packaging of the arrays. Microarrays can be categorized by how they physically isolate each element of the array, by spotting (making small physical wells), on-chip synthesis (synthesizing the target DNA probes adhered directly on the array), or bead-based (adhering samples to barcoded beads randomly distributed across the array).

=== Production process ===
The initial publication on microarray production process dates back to 1995, when 48 cDNAs of a plant were printed on glass slide typically used for light microscopy, modern microarrays on the other hand include now thousands of probes and different carriers with coatings. The fabrication of the microarray requires both biological and physical information, including sample libraries, printers, and slide substrates. Though all procedures and solutions always dependent on the fabrication technique employed. The basic principle of the microarray is the printing of small stains of solutions containing different species of the probe on a slide several thousand times.

Modern printers are HEPA-filtered and have controlled humidity and temperature surroundings, which is typically around 25°C, 50% humidity. Early microarrays were directly printed onto the surface by using printer pins which deposit the samples in a user-defined pattern on the slide. Modern methods are faster, generate less cross-contamination, and produce better spot morphology. The surface to which the probes are printed must be clean, dust free and hydrophobic, for high-density microarrays. Slide coatings include poly-L-lysine, amino silane, epoxy and others, including manufacturers solutions and are chosen based on the type of sample used. Ongoing efforts to advance microarray technology aim to create uniform, dense arrays while reducing the necessary volume of solution and minimizing contamination or damage.

For the manufacturing process, a sample library which contains all relevant information is needed. In the early stages of microarray technology, the sole sample used was DNA, obtained from commonly available clone libraries and acquired through DNA amplification via bacterial vectors. Modern approaches do not include just DNA as a sample anymore, but also proteins, antibodies, antigens, glycans, cell lysates and other small molecules. All samples used are presynthesized, regularly updated, and more straightforward to maintain. Array fabrication techniques include contact printing, lithography, non-contact and cell free printing.

==== Contact printing ====
Contact printing microarray include pin printing, microstamping or flow printing. Pin printing is the oldest and still widest adopted methodology in DNA microarray contact printing. This technique uses pin types like solid pins, split or quill pins to load and deliver the sample solution directly on solid microarray surfaces. Microstamping offers an alternative to the commonly used pin printing and is also referred as soft lithography, which in theory covers different, related pattern transfer technologies using patterned polymer monolithic substrates, the most prominent being microstamping. In contrast to pin printing, microstamping is a more parallel deposition method with less individuality. Certain stamps are loaded with reagents and printed with these reagent solutions identically.

==== Lithography ====
Lithography combines various methods like photolithography, interference lithography, laser writing, electron-beam and dip pen. The most widely used and researched method remains photolithography, in which photolithographic masks are used to target specific nucleotides to the surface. Ultraviolet light (UV) is passed through the mask that acts as a filter to either transmit or block the light from the chemically protected microarray surface. If the UV light has been blocked, the area will remain protected from the addition of nucleotides, whereas in areas which were exposed to UV light, further nucleotides can be added. With this method high-quality custom arrays can be produced with a very high density of DNA features by using a compact device with few moving parts.

==== Non contact ====
Non-contact printing methods vary from photochemistry-based printing, electro-printing and droplet dispensing. In contrast to the other methods, non-contact printing does not involve contact between the surface and the stamp, pin, or other used dispenser. The main advantages are reduced contamination, lesser cleaning and higher throughput which increases steadily. Many of the methods are able to load the probes in parallel, allowing multiple arrays to be produced simultaneously.

==== Cell free ====
In cell free systems, the transcription and translation are carried out in situ, which makes the cloning and expression of proteins in host cells obsolete, because no intact cells are needed. The molecule of interest is directly synthesized onto the surface of a solid area. These assays allow high-throughput analysis in a controlled environment without inferences associated with intact cells.

== See also ==
- Microarray databases
- Microarray analysis techniques
- DNA Microarray
- Biochip
