= Biochip =

Substrates performing biochemical reactions

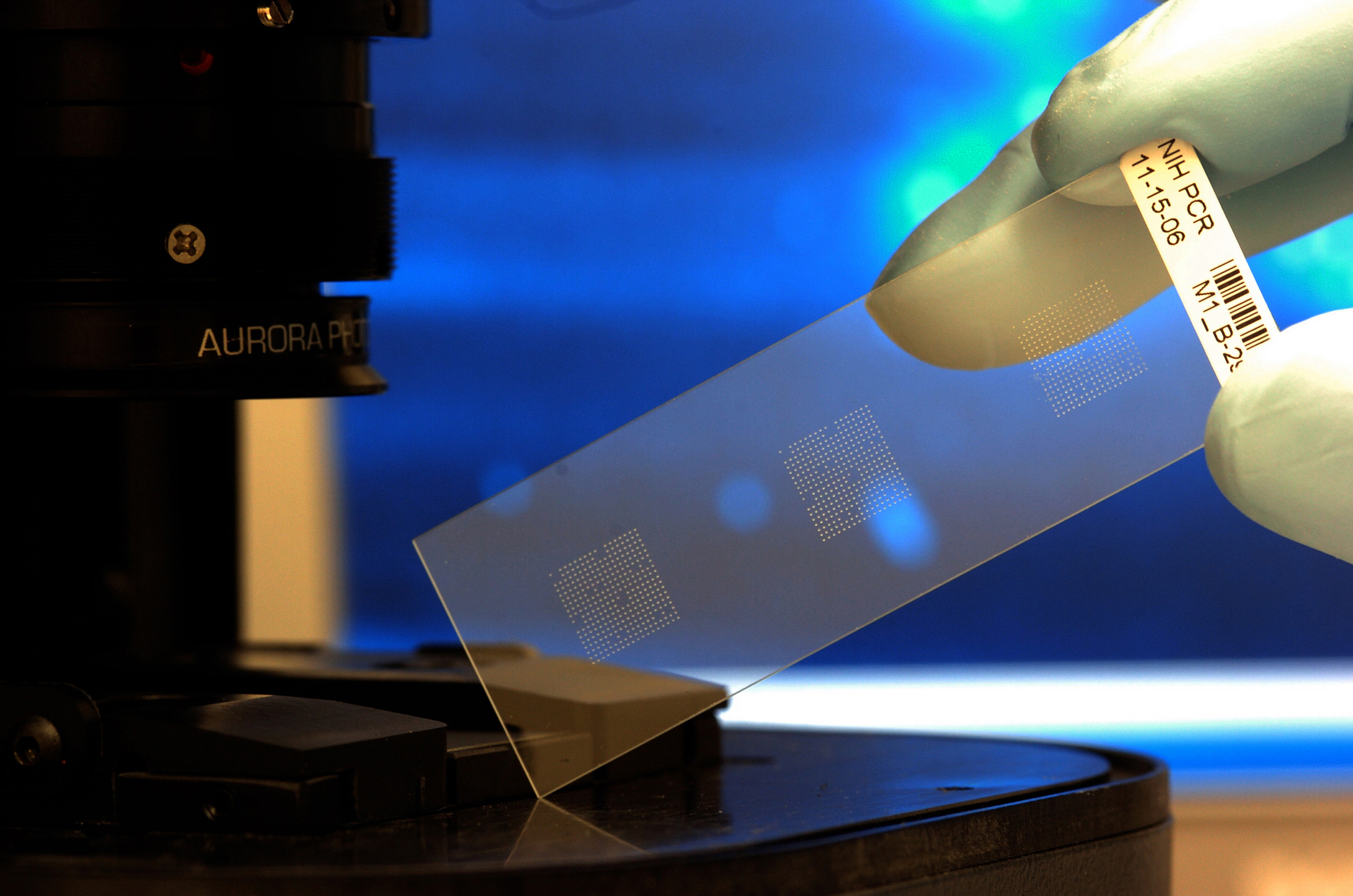
Hundreds of gel drops are visible on the biochip.

In molecular biology, biochips are engineered substrates ("miniaturized laboratories") that can host large numbers of simultaneous biochemical reactions. One of the goals of biochip technology is to efficiently screen large numbers of biological analytes, with potential applications ranging from disease diagnosis to detection of bioterrorism agents. For example, digital microfluidic biochips are under investigation for applications in biomedical fields. In a digital microfluidic biochip, a group of (adjacent) cells in the microfluidic array can be configured to work as storage, functional operations, as well as for transporting fluid droplets dynamically.

== History ==
The development started with early work on the underlying sensor technology. One of the first portable, chemistry-based sensors was the glass pH electrode, invented in 1922 by Hughes. The basic concept of using exchange sites to create permselective membranes was used to develop other ion sensors in subsequent years. For example, a K^{+} sensor was produced by incorporating valinomycin into a thin membrane.

In 1953, Watson and Crick announced their discovery of the now familiar double helix structure of DNA molecules and set the stage for genetics research that continues to the present day. The development of sequencing techniques in 1977 by Gilbert and Sanger (working separately) enabled researchers to directly read the genetic codes that provide instructions for protein synthesis. This research showed how hybridization of complementary single oligonucleotide strands could be used as a basis for DNA sensing. Two additional developments enabled the technology used in modern DNA-based. First, in 1983 Kary Mullis invented the polymerase chain reaction (PCR) technique, a method for amplifying DNA concentrations. This discovery made possible the detection of extremely small quantities of DNA in samples. Secondly in 1986 Hood and co-workers devised a method to label DNA molecules with fluorescent tags instead of radiolabels, thus enabling hybridization experiments to be observed optically.

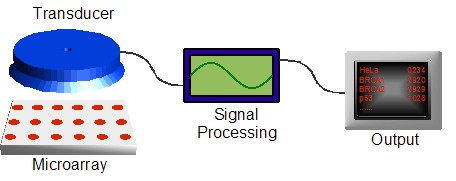
Figure 1. Biochips are a platform that require, in addition to microarray technology, transduction and signal processing technologies to output the results of sensing experiments.

Figure 1 shows the make up of a typical biochip platform. The actual sensing component (or "chip") is just one piece of a complete analysis system. Transduction must be done to translate the actual sensing event (DNA binding, oxidation/reduction, etc.) into a format understandable by a computer (voltage, light intensity, mass, etc.), which then enables additional analysis and processing to produce a final, human-readable output. The multiple technologies needed to make a successful biochip—from sensing chemistry, to microarraying, to signal processing—require a true multidisciplinary approach, making the barrier to entry steep. One of the first commercial biochips was introduced by Affymetrix. Their "GeneChip" products contain thousands of individual DNA sensors for use in sensing defects, or single nucleotide polymorphisms (SNPs), in genes such as p53 (a tumor suppressor) and BRCA1 and BRCA2 (related to breast cancer). The chips are produced by using microlithography techniques traditionally used to fabricate integrated circuits (see below).

== Microarray fabrication ==
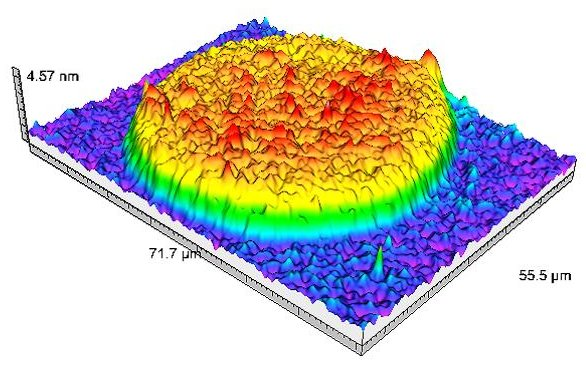
3D Sarfus image of a DNA biochip

The microarray—the dense, two-dimensional grid of biosensors—is the critical component of a biochip platform. Typically, the sensors are deposited on a flat substrate, which may either be passive (e.g. silicon or glass) or active, the latter consisting of integrated electronics or micromechanical devices that perform or assist signal transduction. Surface chemistry is used to covalently bind the sensor molecules to the substrate medium. The fabrication of microarrays is non-trivial and is a major economic and technological hurdle that may ultimately decide the success of future biochip platforms. The primary manufacturing challenge is the process of placing each sensor at a specific position (typically on a Cartesian grid) on the substrate. Various means exist to achieve the placement, but typically robotic micro-pipetting or micro-printing systems are used to place tiny spots of sensor material on the chip surface. Because each sensor is unique, only a few spots can be placed at a time. The low-throughput nature of this process results in high manufacturing costs.

Fodor and colleagues developed a unique fabrication process (later used by Affymetrix) in which a series of microlithography steps is used to combinatorially synthesize hundreds of thousands of unique, single-stranded DNA sensors on a substrate one nucleotide at a time. One lithography step is needed per base type; thus, a total of four steps is required per nucleotide level. Although this technique is very powerful in that many sensors can be created simultaneously, it is currently only feasible for creating short DNA strands (15–25 nucleotides). Reliability and cost factors limit the number of photolithography steps that can be done. Furthermore, light-directed combinatorial synthesis techniques are not currently possible for proteins or other sensing molecules.

As noted above, most microarrays consist of a Cartesian grid of sensors. This approach is used chiefly to map or "encode" the coordinate of each sensor to its function. Sensors in these arrays typically use a universal signalling technique (e.g. fluorescence), thus making coordinates their only identifying feature. These arrays must be made using a serial process (i.e. requiring multiple, sequential steps) to ensure that each sensor is placed at the correct position.

"Random" fabrication, in which the sensors are placed at arbitrary positions on the chip, is an alternative to the serial method. The tedious and expensive positioning process is not required, enabling the use of parallelized self-assembly techniques. In this approach, large batches of identical sensors can be produced; sensors from each batch are then combined and assembled into an array. A non-coordinate based encoding scheme must be used to identify each sensor. As the figure shows, such a design was first demonstrated (and later commercialized by Illumina) using functionalized beads placed randomly in the wells of an etched fiber optic cable. Each bead was uniquely encoded with a fluorescent signature. However, this encoding scheme is limited in the number of unique dye combinations that can be used and successfully differentiated.

== Protein biochip array and other microarray technologies ==
Microarrays are not limited to DNA analysis; protein microarrays, antibody microarray, chemical compound microarray can also be produced using biochips. Randox Laboratories Ltd. launched Evidence, the first protein Biochip Array Technology analyzer in 2003. In protein Biochip Array Technology, the biochip replaces the ELISA plate or cuvette as the reaction platform. The biochip is used to simultaneously analyze a panel of related tests in a single sample, producing a patient profile. The patient profile can be used in disease screening, diagnosis, monitoring disease progression or monitoring treatment. Performing multiple analyses simultaneously, described as multiplexing, allows a significant reduction in processing time and the amount of patient sample required. Biochip Array Technology is a novel application of a familiar methodology, using sandwich, competitive and antibody-capture immunoassays. The difference from conventional immunoassays is that, the capture ligands are covalently attached to the surface of the biochip in an ordered array rather than in solution.

In sandwich assays an enzyme-labelled antibody is used; in competitive assays an enzyme-labelled antigen is used. On antibody-antigen binding a chemiluminescence reaction produces light. Detection is by a charge-coupled device (CCD) camera. The CCD camera is a sensitive and high-resolution sensor able to accurately detect and quantify very low levels of light. The test regions are located using a grid pattern then the chemiluminescence signals are analysed by imaging software to rapidly and simultaneously quantify the individual analytes.

Biochips are also used in the field of microphysiometry e.g. in skin-on-a-chip applications.

For details about other array technologies, see Antibody microarray.

== Types ==
There are several types of biotechnology chips, each designed for specific applications.

=== DNA microarrays ===
DNA microarrays are perhaps the most widely used biotechnology chips. They consist of glass slides, silicon substrates, or polymer-based supports that can bind to specific DNA sequences. Researchers use DNA microarrays to detect gene expression, analyze genetic variation, and explore gene function.

=== Protein chips ===
Protein chips (also known as proteomics chips) are designed to detect and analyze proteins. These chips contain arrays of immobilized proteins or antibodies, which can be used for profiling protein interactions, identification, and quantification.

=== Lab-on-a-chip (LOC) ===
Lab-on-a-chip (LOC) devices integrate multiple laboratory functions into a single chip. These chips incorporate sample preparation, reaction, analysis, and detection into one compact platform. LOC devices are used for clinical diagnostics, environmental monitoring, and chemical analysis.

=== Cell chips ===
Cell chips are designed to grow and analyze living cells. They provide a platform for studying cellular behavior, drug interactions, and cell signaling. Cell-based chips are capable of simulating various physiological and pathological environments, providing high-throughput screening capabilities. This allows for the rapid evaluation of potential drug effects on cells, including drug toxicity, efficacy, and their impact on cellular signaling pathways.

=== Microfluidic chips ===
Microfluidic chips manipulate tiny amounts of liquids and gases in channels with micro-scale dimensions. Commonly fabricated from materials such as polydimethylsiloxane (PDMS), glass, and thermoplastic polymers, these chips demonstrate outstanding biocompatibility and optical properties. These chips are used for a variety of biological applications, including PCR amplification, cell sorting, and DNA sequencing.

== Applications ==
Biotechnology chips have a wide range of applications across many fields.

=== Medical diagnostics ===
Biotechnology chips are widely used in medical diagnostics for detecting diseases such as cancer, infections, and genetic disorders, owing to its advantages of high throughput, high sensitivity, rapid detection, and low sample consumption. These chips can rapidly analyze samples of blood, saliva, or tissue to detect genetic mutations, infectious agents, and biomarkers.

=== Drug development and personalized medicine ===
Biotechnology chips play a key role in the development of new drugs. They enable high-throughput screening of potential drug compounds and help identify biomarkers for personalized treatment plans. Additionally, the use of biotechnology chips allows for more efficient testing of drug efficacy and safety.

=== Genomics and proteomics ===
Biotechnology chips are used in genomics and proteomics research. DNA microarrays and protein chips enable scientists to analyze large amounts of genetic and protein data simultaneously. These chips facilitate the study of gene expression, genetic variation, and protein interactions, advancing the understanding of complex biological systems.

=== Environmental monitoring ===
Lab-on-a-chip and microfluidic devices are also used for environmental monitoring. These chips can test water, air, and soil samples for contaminants, pathogens, and toxins. Their portable nature allows for on-site analysis, making them valuable for environmental research and disaster response.

=== Agricultural biotechnology ===
Biotechnology chips are used in agricultural research to analyze crops, monitor soil health, and study plant pathogens. They enable more efficient and precise breeding programs, improving crop yield, pest resistance, and disease prevention.

== See also ==
- Chemical compound microarray
- DNA microarray
- Lab-on-a-chip
- Magnetic immunoassay
- Microphysiometry
- Nanosensors
- Organ-on-a-chip
- Planar Patch Clamp
- Protein array
- Sequencing
- Single nucleotide polymorphism
- Tissue microarray
