= Grace Bio-Labs =

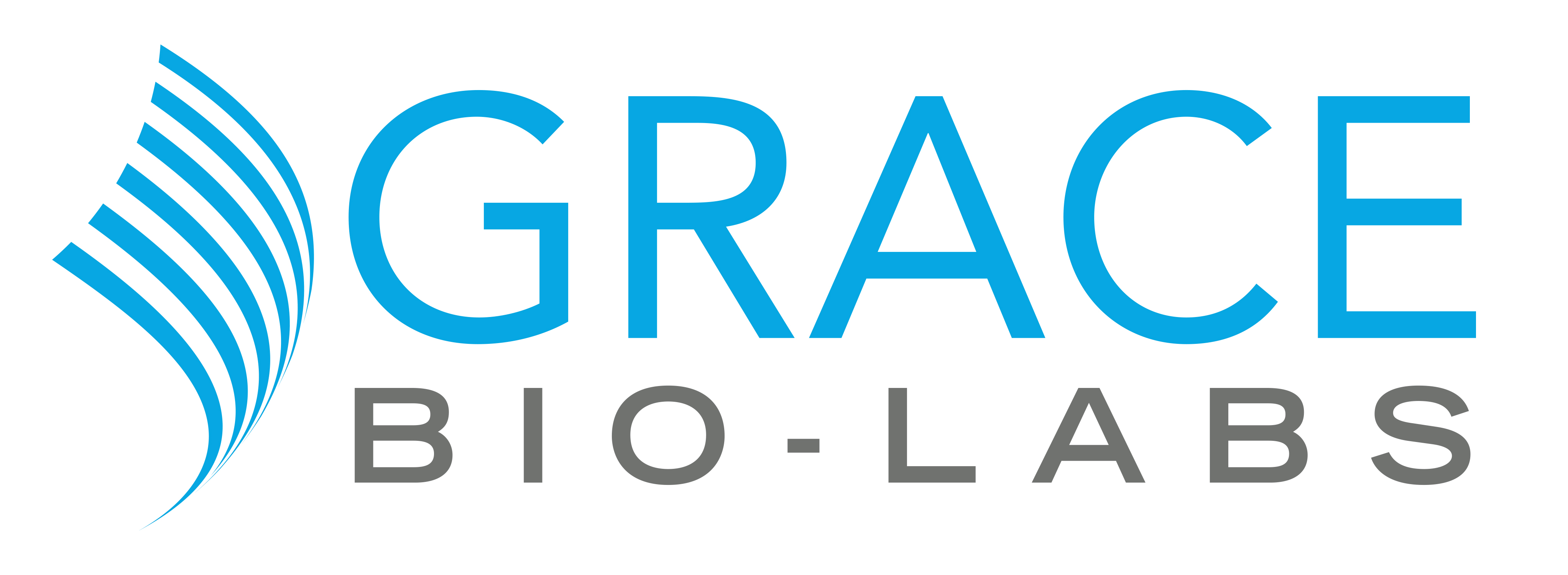
- Industry: Biotechnology, Research Products
- Founded: 1986
- Headquarters: Bend, Oregon, USA,
- Key people: Lisa Hale; Jennipher Grudzien; Thayne Edwards- Engineering
- Products: ONCYTE® Nitrocellulose; Film Slides
- Website: www.gracebio.com

Grace Bio-Labs is a global supplier of pharmaceutical, biomedical, and biochemical research products based in Bend, Oregon, United States. They develop the thin-cast nitrocellulose biochip (a.k.a. nitrocellulose slide, nitrocellulose film slide) and the modern hybridization and incubation chambers for glass microscope slides.

== History ==
Originally based near Detroit, Michigan, and founded by Charles McGrath in 1986, Grace Bio Labs relocated to Bend, Oregon in May, 1990.

With the aid of SBIR funding, Grace Bio-Labs was built on two main product types. The first is the incubation chamber for cell culture and analysis; the second is the ONCYTE Nitrocellulose Film Slide. Their incubation and hybridization chambers are fluid delivery and containment products that increase sensitivity and efficiency in fluorescence and color-based protein and cell analyte assays.

The ONCYTE Nitrocellulose microporous film (nitrocellulose slide) is a biochip platform that captures and protects the 3-dimensional (tertiary) structure of biological material. Originally designed for tissue printing and cell lysate capture, the film has flourished in proteomics. It is commonly used in automated and manual protein microarrays, and continues to increase throughput in proteomics research.

== Customer Base ==
Grace Bio-Labs sells to university research laboratories, biotech companies, private researchers and pharmaceutical companies. They mainly distribute to North America, Western and Central Europe, East Asia, and Southeast Asia.

== See also ==
- List of companies based in Oregon
