= UniPROBE =

Content
- Description: database of protein-binding microarray data on protein-DNA interactions.

Contact
- Authors: Daniel E. Newburger
- Primary citation: Newburger & al. (2009)
- Release date: 2009

Access
- Website: http://uniprobe.org

The Universal PBM Resource for Oligonucleotide-Binding Evaluation (UniPROBE) is database of DNA-binding proteins determined by protein-binding microarrays.

== See also ==
- Protein microarray
- DNA-binding domain
