= Reverse phase =

Reverse phase (RP) refer to :

- Reversed-phase chromatography, any chromatographic method that uses a non-polar stationary phase
- Reverse phase protein lysate microarray, a micro-cell lysate dot-blot that allows measurement of protein expression levels
