= Sima Lev =

Israeli biologist and academic

- סימה לב
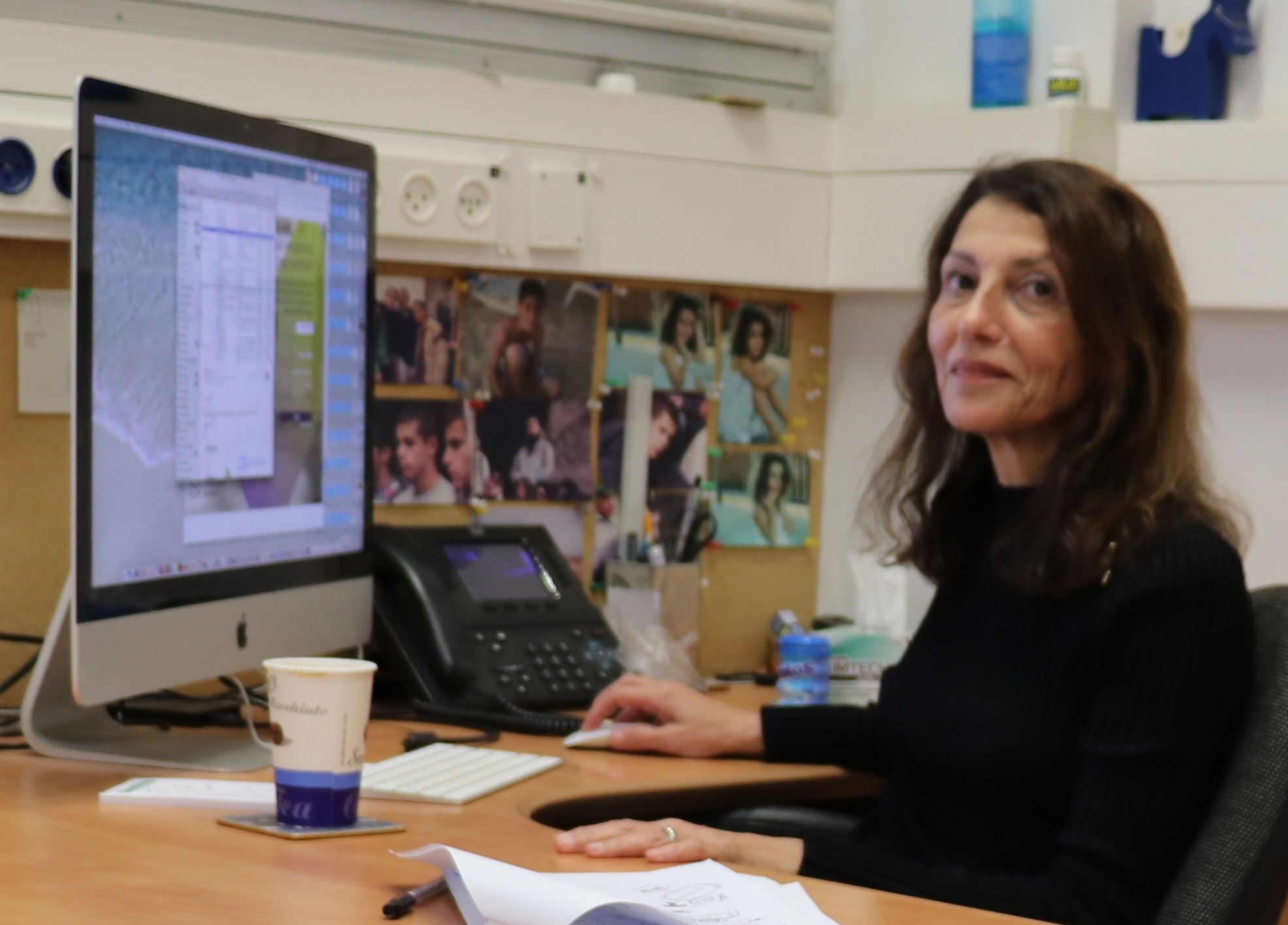
- Education: Weizmann Institute of Science; Tel Aviv University
- Scientific career
- Workplaces: Weizmann Institute of Science
- Thesis: בדוד ואפיון שני אתרי ATTB) ATTACHMENT ו-ATTR), המשתתפים ברקומבינציה היחודית של הבקטריופאז HK022 (https://worldcat.org/en/title/810416021)

Sima Lev (Hebrew: סימה לב) is an Israeli biologist and the Joyce and Ben B. Eisenberg Professorial Chair of Molecular Cell Biology at the Weizmann Institute of Science. Her research focuses on the mechanisms that drive the development of triple-negative breast cancer and to identify new therapeutic strategies. She has identified and characterized several novel human genes including PYK2, Nir1, Nir2, and Nir3.

== Early life and education ==
Lev is from Israel. She completed her undergraduate and graduate degree at Tel Aviv University. She moved to the Weizmann Institute of Science for her doctoral research, where she studied ATTB sites involved in the recombination of bacteriophages.

== Research and career ==
The signalling pathways that determine cell growth are impacted by environmental cues, including nutrients and growth factors. Lev studies how these signalling networks behave in normal and cancerous cells.

Triple-negative breast cancer (TNBC) impacts approximately 20% breast cancer patients. Despite its prevalence, there are no established effective targeted therapies, and standard chemotherapy is the only systemic treatment. As a result, chemo-resistance is a major challenge for the treatment of TNBC. Chemoresistance gives rise to advanced metastatic disease. Lev has investigated new molecular targets for TNBC that regulate the metastasis of TNBC. Her lab combines bioinformatics with transcriptomics to identify the signalling pathways that drive the progression of tumours.

Multi-modal combination therapies are often used in cancer treatment to leverage different treatment approaches and reduce the likelihood that drug-resistant cancer cells develop. Lev used high-throughput screening with a library of chemotherapies and small molecule inhibitors to identify combination therapies for TNBC.

Lev uses reverse phase protein arrays for the characterisation of cell signalling. She monitors how signalling pathways respond dynamically in response to stimuli and other perturbations. She has studied the non-receptor tyrosine kinase PYK2, a protein-coding gene whose downstream pathways determine proliferation and migration.

Small vesicles that are below 100 nm in size are known as exosomes. Exosomes are produced by cancer cells, impact disease progression and serve as biomarkers for prognosis. Lev has studied the exosomes of TNBC patients, looking to understand how they respond to treatments and the mechanisms that underpin their production.

== Select publications ==
- S Lev; H Moreno; R Martinez; et al. (31 August 1995). "Protein tyrosine kinase PYK2 involved in Ca(2+)-induced regulation of ion channel and MAP kinase functions". Nature. 376 (6543): 737–45. Bibcode:1995Natur.376..737L. doi:10.1038/376737a0. ISSN 1476-4687. PMID 7544443. Wikidata Q24307776.
- I Dikic; G Tokiwa; S Lev; S A Courtneidge; J Schlessinger (10 October 1996). "A role for Pyk2 and Src in linking G-protein-coupled receptors with MAP kinase activation". Nature. 383 (6600): 547–50. Bibcode:1996Natur.383..547D. doi:10.1038/383547a0. ISSN 1476-4687. PMID 8849729. Wikidata Q24312845.
- Sima Lev (8 September 2010). "Non-vesicular lipid transport by lipid-transfer proteins and beyond". Nature Reviews Molecular Cell Biology. 11 (10): 739–750. doi:10.1038/nrm2971. ISSN 1471-0072. PMID 20823909. Wikidata Q37786206.
