= Retrogenix =

British biotechnology company

Charles River High Peak
- Type: Public
- Industry: Biotechnology
- Founded: Sheffield, UK (2008)
- Founders: Dr. Jim Freeth, Jo Soden
- Products: Human Cell Microarray Screening (Service)
- Number of employees: 11-50
- Website: www.criver.com

Retrogenix is a biotechnology company based in the United Kingdom. Founded by Jim Freeth and Jo Soden in 2008, the company was acquired in April 2021 by Charles River Laboratories and is now known as the ‘High Peak’ site.

== Research and development ==
Currently, more than 4,500 proteins are simultaneously expressed in the Cell Microarray system for individual screening. The human expression system allows for correct folding and localisation at the surface of the cell and there are documented cases of biological interactions that are mediated by post-translational modifications being detected using the technology.

== Applications in medical research ==
The Cell Microarray technology identifies targets and receptors that are important in the understanding of normal biological and disease processes. Diverse ligands can be screened using the technology which has led to the discovery of key receptors for malaria proteins and targets that mediate virus binding to human cells.

== Target deconvolution ==
Cell Microarray screening identifies the receptors for biologic molecules that have been selected through phenotypic screening. Notably, in studies led by Medimmune, the technology identified disease-relevant cell surface antigens of promising phenotypic molecules.

== Off-target profiling ==
Cell Microarray off-target profiling assesses the specificity of ligands, either prior to clinical testing or to uncover the mechanism of action for an observed adverse event or an unexpected pharmacokinetic profile.

== Awards ==
Retrogenix has twice won the Queen's Awards for Enterprise. The first award was granted for innovation in 2015. This was followed by an award for international trade in 2017.
