= Antibody microarray =

Form of protein microarray

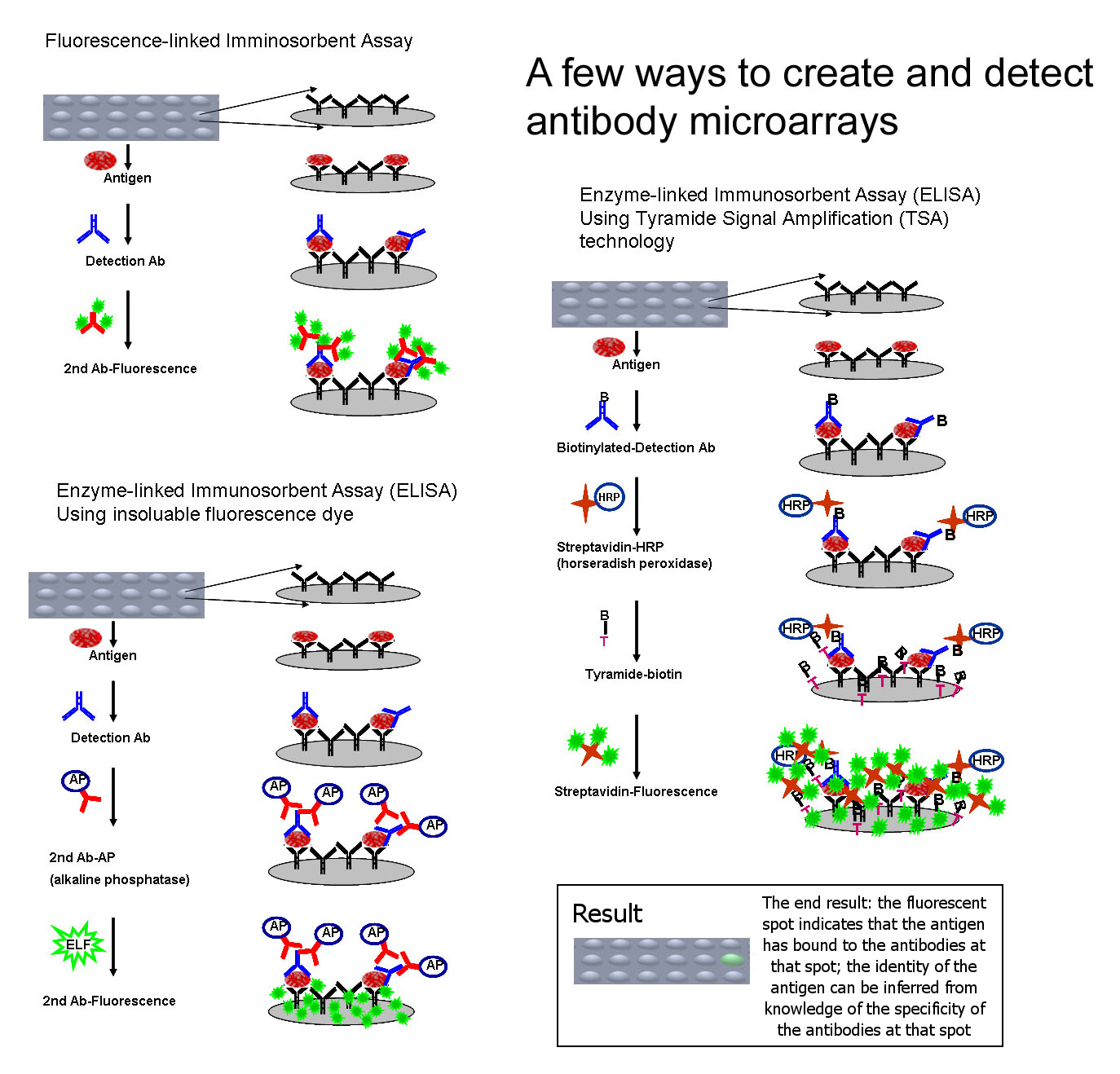
Samples of antibody microarray creations and detections

An antibody microarray (also known as antibody array) is a specific form of protein microarray. In this technology, a collection of captured antibodies are spotted and fixed on a solid surface such as glass, plastic, membrane, or silicon chip, and the interaction between the antibody and its target antigen is detected. Antibody microarrays are often used for detecting protein expression from various biofluids including serum, plasma and cell or tissue lysates. Antibody arrays may be used for both basic research and medical and diagnostic applications.

== Background ==
The concept and methodology of antibody microarrays were first introduced by Tse Wen Chang in 1983 in a scientific publication and a series of patents, when he was working at Centocor in Malvern, Pennsylvania. Chang coined the term "antibody matrix" and discussed "array" arrangement of minute antibody spots on small glass or plastic surfaces. He demonstrated that a 10×10 (100 in total) and 20×20 (400 in total) grid of antibody spots could be placed on a 1×1 cm surface. He also estimated that if an antibody is coated at a 10 μg/mL concentration, which is optimal for most antibodies, 1 mg of antibody can make 2,000,000 dots of 0.25 mm diameter. Chang's invention focused on the employment of antibody microarrays for the detection and quantification of cells bearing certain surface antigens, such as CD antigens and HLA allotypic antigens, particulate antigens, such as viruses and bacteria, and soluble antigens. The principle of "one sample application, multiple determinations", assay configuration, and mechanics for placing absorbent dots described in the paper and patents should be generally applicable to different kinds of microarrays. When Tse Wen Chang and Nancy T. Chang were setting up Tanox, Inc. in Houston, Texas in 1986, they purchased the rights on the antibody matrix patents from Centocor as part of the technology base to build their new startup. Their first product in development was an assay, termed "immunosorbent cytometry", which could be employed to monitor the immune status, i.e., the concentrations and ratios of CD3^{+}, CD4^{+}, and CD8^{+} T cells, in the blood of HIV-infected individuals.

The theoretical background for protein microarray-based ligand binding assays was further developed by Roger Ekins and colleagues in the late 1980s. According to the model, antibody microarrays would not only permit simultaneous screening of an analyte panel, but would also be more sensitive and rapid than conventional screening methods. Interest in screening large protein sets only arose as a result of the achievements in genomics by DNA microarrays and the Human Genome Project.

The first array approaches attempted to miniaturize biochemical and immunobiological assays usually performed in 96-well microtiter plates. While 96-well plate-based antibody arrays have high-throughput capability, the small surface area in each well limits the number of antibody spots and thus, the number of analytes detected. Other solid supports, such as glass slides and nitrocellulose membranes, were subsequently utilized to develop arrays which could accommodate larger panels of antibodies. Nitrocellulose membrane-based arrays are flexible, easy to handle, and have increased protein binding capacity, but are less amenable to high throughput or automated processing. Chemically derivatized glass slides allow for printing of sub-microliter sized antibody spots, reducing the array surface area without sacrificing spot density. This in turn reduces the volume of sample consumed. Glass slide-based arrays, owing to their smooth and rigid structure, can also be easily fitted to high-throughput liquid handling systems.

Most antibody array systems employ 1 of 2 non-competitive methods of immunodetection: single-antibody (label-based) detection and 2-antibody (sandwich-based) detection. The latter method, in which analyte detection requires the binding of 2 distinct antibodies (a capture antibody and a reporter antibody, each binding to a unique epitope), confers greater specificity and lower background signal compared with label-based immunodetection (where only 1 capture antibody is used and detection is achieved by chemically labeling all proteins in the starting sample). Sandwich-based antibody arrays usually attain the highest specificity and sensitivity (ng – pg levels) of any array format; their reproducibility also enables quantitative analysis to be performed. Due to the difficulty of developing matched antibody pairs that are compatible with all other antibodies in the panel, small arrays often make use of a sandwich approach. Conversely, high-density arrays are easier to develop at a lower cost using the single antibody label-based approach. In this methodology, one set of specific antibodies is used and all the proteins in a sample are labelled directly by fluorescent dyes or haptens.

Initial uses of antibody-based array systems included detecting IgGs and specific subclasses, analyzing antigens, screening recombinant antibodies, studying yeast protein kinases, analyzing autoimmune antibodies, and examining protein-protein interactions. The first approach to simultaneously detect multiple cytokines from physiological samples using antibody array technology was by Ruo-Pan Huang and colleagues in 2001. Their approach used Hybond ECL membranes to detect a small panel of 24 cytokines from cell culture conditioned media and patient's sera and was able to profile cytokine expression at physiological levels. Huang took this technology and started a new business, RayBiotech, Inc., the first to successfully commercialize a planar antibody array.

In the last ten years, the sensitivity of the method was improved by an optimization of the surface chemistry as well as dedicated protocols for their chemical labeling. Currently, the sensitivity of antibody arrays is comparable to that of ELISA and antibody arrays are regularly used for profiling experiments on tissue samples, plasma or serum samples and many other sample types. One main focus in antibody array based profiling studies is biomarker discovery, specifically for cancer. For cancer-related research, the development and application of an antibody array comprising 810 different cancer-related antibodies was reported in 2010. Also in 2010, an antibody array comprising 507 cytokines, chemokines, adipokines, growth factors, angiogenic factors, proteases, soluble receptors, soluble adhesion molecules, and other proteins was used to screen the serum of ovarian cancer patients and healthy individuals and found a significant difference in protein expression between normal and cancer samples. More recently, antibody arrays have helped determine specific allergy-related serum proteins whose levels are associated with glioma and can reduce the risk years before diagnosis. Protein profiling with antibody arrays have also proven successful in areas other than cancer research, specifically in neurological diseases such as Alzheimer's. A number of studies have attempted to identify biomarker panels that can distinguish Alzheimer's patients, and many have used antibody arrays in this process. Jaeger and colleagues measured nearly 600 circulatory proteins to discover biological pathways and networks affected in Alzheimer's and explored the positive and negative relationships of the levels of those individual proteins and networks with the cognitive performance of Alzheimer's patients. Currently the largest commercially available sandwich-based antibody array detects 1000 different proteins. In addition, antibody microarray based protein profiling services are available analyzing protein abundance and protein phosphorylation or ubiquitinylation status of 1030 proteins in parallel.

Antibody arrays are often used for detecting protein expression from many sample types, but also in those with various preparations. Jiang and colleagues illustrated nicely the correlation between array protein expression in two different blood preparations: serum and dried blood spots. These different blood sample preparations were analyzed using three antibody array platforms: sandwich-based, quantitative, and label-based, and a strong correlation in protein expression was found, suggesting that dried blood spots, which are a more convenient, safe, and inexpensive means of obtaining blood especially in non-hospitalized public health areas, can be used effectively with antibody array analysis for biomarker discovery, protein profiling, and disease screening, diagnosis, and treatment.

== Applications ==
Using antibody microarray in different medical diagnostic areas has attracted researchers attention. Digital bioassay is an example of such research domains. In this technology, an array of microwells on a glass/polymer chip are seeded with magnetic beads (coated with fluorescent tagged antibodies), subjected to targeted antigens and then characterised by a microscope through counting fluorescing wells. A cost-effective fabrication platform (using OSTE polymers) for such microwell arrays has been recently demonstrated and the bio-assay model system has been successfully characterised. Furthermore, immunoassays on thiol-ene "synthetic paper" micropillar scaffolds have shown to generate a superior fluorescence signal.

== See also ==
- ELISA
- Protein microarray
- DNA microarray
- Tissue microarray
- Chemical compound microarray
- Microarray imprinting and surface energy patterning
