= Cellular microarray =

A cellular microarray (or cell microarray) is a laboratory tool that allows for the multiplex interrogation of living cells on the surface of a solid support. The support, sometimes called a "chip", is spotted with varying materials, such as antibodies, proteins, or lipids, which can interact with the cells, leading to their capture on specific spots. Combinations of different materials can be spotted in a given area, allowing not only cellular capture, when a specific interaction exists, but also the triggering of a cellular response, change in phenotype, or detection of a response from the cell, such as a specific secreted factor.

There are a large number of types of cellular microarrays:

1. Reverse transfection cell microarrays. David M. Sabatini's laboratory developed reverse-transfection cell microarrays at the Whitehead Institute, publishing their work in 2001.
2. PMHC Cellular Microarrays. This type of microarray were developed by Daniel Chen, Yoav Soen, Dan Kraft, Patrick Brown and Mark Davis at Stanford University Medical Center.
