= PMHC cellular microarray =

PMHC cellular microarrays are a type of cellular microarray that has been spotted with pMHC complexes peptide-MHC class I or peptide-MHC class II.

These biochips can be used to interrogate immune cells, particularly antigen-specific T cells, from clinical samples for what they are capable of recognizing. They can also be co-spotted with other molecules, such as antibodies that capture cytokines, allowing for high-throughput functional analysis of the captured T cells. Molecules spotted on a pMHC cellular microarray can be classified as capture molecules, detector molecules and effector molecules.

They were developed by Daniel Chen, Yoav Soen, Dan Kraft, Pat Brown and Mark Davis at Stanford University Medical Center.
