= Biomarker discovery =

Biomarker discovery is a medical term describing the process by which biomarkers are discovered. Many commonly used blood tests in medicine are biomarkers. There is interest in biomarker discovery on the part of the pharmaceutical industry; blood-test or other biomarkers could serve as intermediate markers of disease in clinical trials, and as possible drug targets.

== Mechanism of action ==
The way that these tests have been found can be viewed as biomarker discovery; however, their identification has primarily been made one at a time. Many well-known tests have been identified based on biological insight from the fields of physiology or biochemistry; therefore, only a few markers at a time have been considered. An example of biomarker discovery is the use of insulin to assess kidney function. From this process a naturally occurring molecule (creatinine) was discovered, enabling the same measurements to be made without insulin injections.

The recent interest in biomarker discovery is spurred by new molecular biologic techniques, which promise to find relevant markers rapidly without detailed insight into the mechanisms of a disease. By screening many possible biomolecules at a time, a parallel approach can be attempted; genomics and proteomics are some technologies used in this process. Secretomics has also emerged as an important technology in the high-throughput search for biomarkers; however, significant technical difficulties remain.

The identification of clinically significant protein biomarkers of phenotype and biological function is an expanding area of research which will extend diagnostic capabilities. Biomarkers for a number of diseases have recently emerged, including prostate specific antigen (PSA) for prostate cancer and C-reactive protein (CRP) for heart disease. The epigenetic clock which measures the age of cells/tissues/organs based on DNA methylation levels is arguably the most accurate genomic biomarker. Using biomarkers from easily assessable biofluids (e.g. blood and urine) is beneficial in evaluating the state of harder-to-reach tissues and organs. Biofluids are more readily accessible, unlike more invasive or unfeasible techniques (such as tissue biopsy).

Biofluids contain proteins from tissues and serve as effective hormonal communicators. The tissue acts as a transmitter of information, and the biofluid (sampled by physician) acts as a receiver. The informativeness of the biofluid relies on the fidelity of the channel. Sources of noise which decrease fidelity include the addition of proteins derived from other tissues (or from the biofluid itself); proteins may also be lost through glomerular filtration. These factors can significantly influence the protein composition of a biofluid. In addition, simply looking at protein overlap would miss information transmission occurring through classes of proteins and protein-protein interactions.

Instead, the proteins' projection onto functional, drug, and disease spaces allow measurement of the functional distance between tissue and biofluids. Proximity in these abstract spaces signifies a low level of distortion across the information channel (and, hence, high performance by the biofluid). However, current approaches to biomarker prediction have analyzed tissues and biofluids separately.

== Methods of discovery ==
=== Genomic approach ===
There are four major methods for genomic analysis. First, a northern blot can be used to isolate a set of RNA sequences. Second and third, they can be analyzed by standard Gene expression techniques, or surveyed using SAGE. Lastly, a DNA microarray measurement can be taken, to determine the frequency of each gene; this information can be used to determine whether a gene is a biomarker.

Often, a polymerase chain reaction is used to create many copies of the sequences to make them easier to work with. In February 2016, Dr. Laura Elnitski and company used this technique to detect a biomarker shared by five types of cancer.

=== Proteomic approach ===
Proteomic methods are an effective tool for analysis of biomarkers with advantages including fast and accurate screening for diseases in, for example, blood serum. Common proteomic techniques for biomarkers includes:

1. 2D-PAGE
2. LC-MS
3. SELDI-TOF (or MALDI-TOF)
4. Antibody array
5. Tissue microarray

=== Metabolomic approach ===
The term metabolomic has been recently introduced to address the global analysis of all metabolites in a biological sample. A related term, metabonomics, was introduced to refer specifically to the analysis of metabolic responses to drugs or diseases. Metabonomics has become a major area of research; it is the complex system biological study, used as a method to identify the biomarker for various disease. In general, in most disease cases, a metabolic pathway had or has been either activated or deactivated - this parameter can thus be used as a marker for some diseases. Serotonin production pathways, activated in a person who has recently consumed alcohol for instance, can be a metabolic marker of recent alcohol consumption.

=== Lipidomics approach ===
Lipidomics refers to the analysis of lipids. Since lipids have unique physical properties, they have been traditionally difficult to study. However, improvements in new analytical platforms have made it possible to identify and to quantify most of lipids metabolites from a single sample. Three key platforms used for lipid profiling include mass spectrometry, chromatography, and nuclear magnetic resonance. Mass spectrometry was used to delineate the relative concentration and composition of high-density lipoproteins (HDL) particles from lipid extracts isolated from coronary bypass patients and healthy volunteers. They found that HDL particles from coronary bypass patients contained significantly less sphingomyelin relative to phosphatidylcholine and higher triglycerides relative to cholesteryl esters. Lipidomic profiling was also used to study the effect of rosiglitazone, a PPARγ agonist, on lipid metabolism on mice. Rosiglitazone was observed to alter lipid composition in different organs. It increased triglycerides accumulation in the liver; altered free fatty acids in the heart, in the adipose tissue, and in the heart; and reduced triglyceride levels in plasma.

=== Glycomics approach ===
Glycosylation is a common posttranslational protein modifications, and almost all cell surface and secreted proteins are modified by covalently-linked carbohydrates. Eukaryotic glycans are generally classified into two main groups: N- and O-glycans, where the glycan chains are linked to asparagine and serine/threonine residues, respectively. Glycans are essential mediators of biological processes such as protein folding, cell signalling, fertilization, embryogenesis, neuronal development, hormone activity and the proliferation of cells and their organization into specific tissues. In addition, overwhelming data supports the relevance of glycosylation in pathogen recognition, inflammation, innate immune responses, and the development of autoimmune diseases and cancer. However, the identification of these biomarkers has not been easy, mainly due to the structural diversity and numerous possible glycan isomers. Fortunately, glycomics is becoming more feasible due to major improvements in mass spectrometry and separation science.

== Ex vivo blood stimulation ==
Ex vivo blood stimulation is the process by which researchers can analyse the immunological biomarkers of drug effects in healthy volunteers. Blood samples (taken from healthy volunteers) are stimulated in the laboratory to activate the immune system. Ex vivo blood stimulation studies, therefore, allow the evaluation of the effect of a new compound in a "living system" in which the immune system has been challenged. Most research using this method is carried out by Phase I clinical research organisations, allowing them to collect blood samples and analyse them instantly so they do not deteriorate.

== See also ==
- Biomarker
- Biomarker (medicine)
- Clinical chemistry
- Clinical proteomics
- Drug discovery
- Genomics
- Proteomics
- Secretomics
- Endophenotype
- Massive parallel sequencing
