= Nitrocellulose slide =

A nitrocellulose slide (or nitrocellulose film slide) is a glass microscope slide that is coated with nitrocellulose that is used to bind biological material, often protein, for colorimetric and fluorescence detection assays. For this purpose, a nitrocellulose slide is generally considered to be superior to glass, because it binds a great deal more protein, and protects the tertiary structure of the protein (and other biological material, i.e.: cells). Typically, nitrocellulose slides have a thin, opaque film of nitrocellulose on a standard 25mm × 75 mm glass microscope slide. The film is extremely sensitive to contact, and to foreign material; contact causes deformation and deposition of material, especially liquids.

A nitrocellulose slide is different from a nitrocellulose membrane, which usually filters protein from solution (i.e.: physician's office pregnancy tests), but that it serves a similar goal: to detect the presence and/or concentration level of certain biological material.

== Microarrays ==
Nitrocellulose slides are used mainly in proteomics to do protein microarrays with automated systems that print the slides and record results. Microarrays of cell analytes, arrays of cell lysate, antibody microarrays, tissue printing, immunoarrays, etc. are also possible with the slide.

== Nitrocellulose fluorescence ==
Due to their high surface roughness, conventional white nitrocellulose films scatter and reflect large amounts of excitation and emission light during the fluorescence detection in the microarray scanner. In addition, nitrocellulose exhibits a natural autofluorescence at the detection wavelengths commonly used. Both these factors lead to a high background fluorescent signal from these membrane slides. To overcome this problem, a new process has been developed to generate black membranes that absorb the scattered light, significantly reducing the background auto-fluorescence and thus offering a very low and homogenous auto-fluorescence to achieve a significantly improved dynamic range. These slides are commercially available through Schott AG. Nevertheless, conventional white nitrocellulose films continue to be the dominant surface for many protein microarray applications because the claims above have not proved relevant to end user requirements. Regardless, nitrocellulose slide manufacturers like Grace Bio-Labs continue to develop new nitrocellulose surfaces to further optimize their use in protein microarrays.

A method for protein quantitation on nitrocellulose coated glass slides uses near-IR fluorescent detection with quantum dots. Traditional porous nitrocellulose signal to noise is limited by auto-fluorescence of the nitrocellulose at the respective required wavelengths of excitation and emission for standard organic fluorescent detection probes. Near IR detection probes are excited and read at emission wavelengths outside the range of nitrocellulose fluorescence.
