= Chemical compound microarray =

A chemical compound microarray is a collection of organic chemical compounds spotted on a solid surface, such as glass and plastic. This microarray format is very similar to DNA microarray, protein microarray and antibody microarray. In chemical genetics research, they are routinely used for searching proteins that bind with specific chemical compounds, and in general drug discovery research, they provide a multiplex way to search potential drugs for therapeutic targets.

There are three different forms of chemical compound microarrays based on the fabrication method. The first form is to covalently immobilize the organic compounds on the solid surface with diverse linking techniques; this platform is usually called Small Molecule Microarray, which is invented and advanced by Dr. Stuart Schreiber and colleagues . The second form is to spot and dry organic compounds on the solid surface without immobilization, this platform has a commercial name as Micro Arrayed Compound Screening (μARCS), which is developed by scientists in Abbott Laboratories . The last form is to spot organic compounds in a homogenous solution without immobilization and drying effect, this platform is developed by Dr. Dhaval Gosalia and Dr. Scott Diamond and later commercialized as DiscoveryDot technology by Reaction Biology Corporation .

Polymer Microarrays

Polymer microarrays have been developed to allow screening for new polymeric materials to direct different tissue lineages. Research has also been directed towards studying the surface chemistry of these arrays to determine which surface chemistries control cell adhesion, although concerns have been raised as to the influence of the substrate on measurements and the questionable statistical interpretation of results.

The lack of control in the production of many of these polymer arrays suggests that any practical application of these technologies will be limited. This is particularly true for the in situ polymerisation of acrylate monomers in minute volumes.
