= Cell-free protein array =

DNA technology

Cell-free protein array technology produces protein microarrays by performing in vitro synthesis of the target proteins from their DNA templates. This method of synthesizing protein microarrays overcomes the many obstacles and challenges faced by traditional methods of protein array production that have prevented widespread adoption of protein microarrays in proteomics. Protein arrays made from this technology can be used for testing protein–protein interactions, as well as protein interactions with other cellular molecules such as DNA and lipids. Other applications include enzymatic inhibition assays and screenings of antibody specificity.

== Overview and background ==
The runaway success of DNA microarrays has generated much enthusiasm for protein microarrays; however, protein microarrays have not quite taken off. One major reason is that protein microarrays are much more laborious and technically challenging to construct than DNA microarrays, even with tools and prior knowledge from DNA microarrays available.

The traditional methods of producing protein arrays require the separate in vivo expression of hundreds or thousands of proteins, followed by separate purification and immobilization of the proteins on a solid surface. Cell-free protein array technology attempts to simplify protein microarray construction by bypassing the need to express the proteins in bacteria cells and the subsequent need to purify them. It takes advantage of available cell-free protein synthesis technology which has demonstrated that protein synthesis can occur without an intact cell as long as cell extracts containing the DNA template, transcription and translation raw materials and machinery are provided. Common sources of cell extracts used in cell-free protein array technology include wheat germ, Escherichia coli, and rabbit reticulocyte. Cell extracts from other sources such as hyperthermophiles, hybridomas, Xenopus oocytes, insect, mammalian and human cells have also been used.

The target proteins are synthesized in situ on the protein microarray, directly from the DNA template, thus skipping many of the steps in traditional protein microarray production and their accompanying technical limitations. More importantly, the expression of the proteins can be done in parallel, meaning all the proteins can be expressed together in a single reaction. This ability to multiplex protein expression is a major time-saver in the production process.

== Methods of synthesis ==
=== In situ methods ===
In the in situ method, protein synthesis is carried out on a protein array surface that is pre-coated with a protein-capturing reagent or antibody. Once the newly synthesized proteins are released from the ribosome, the tag sequence that is also synthesized at the N- or C-terminus of each nascent protein will be bound by the capture reagent or antibody, thus immobilizing the proteins to form an array. Commonly used tags include polyhistidine (His)6 and glutathione s-transferase (GST).

Various research groups have developed their own methods, each differing in their approach, but can be summarized into 3 main groups.

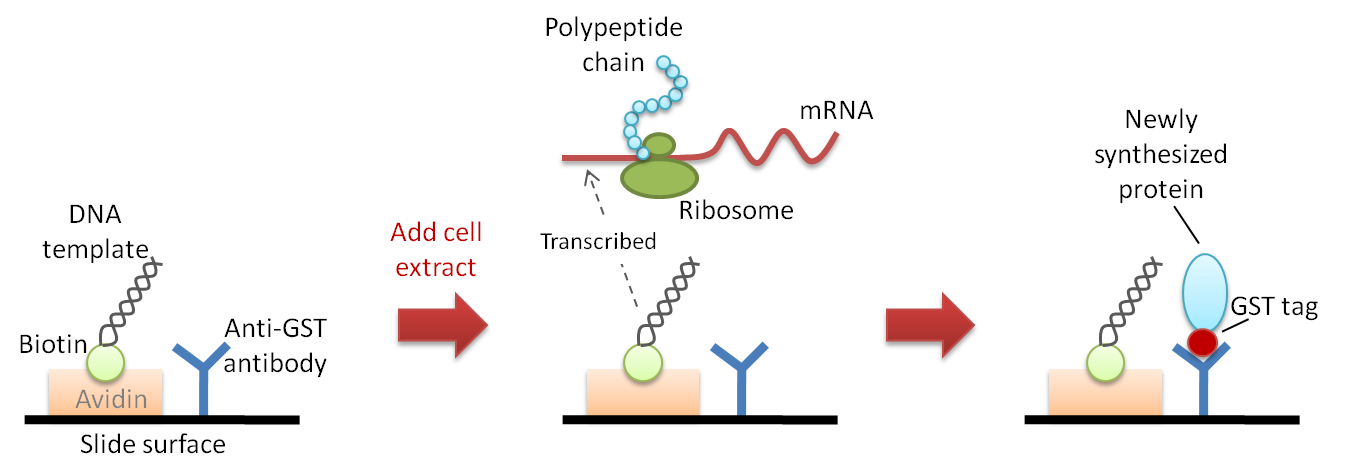
Diagram of NAPPA

==== Nucleic acid programmable protein array (NAPPA) ====
NAPPA uses DNA template that has already been immobilized onto the same protein capture surface. The DNA template is biotinylated and is bound to avidin that is pre-coated onto the protein capture surface. Newly synthesized proteins which are tagged with GST are then immobilized next to the template DNA by binding to the adjacent polyclonal anti-GST capture antibody that is also pre-coated onto the capture surface. The main drawback of this method is the extra and tedious preparation steps at the beginning of the process: (1) the cloning of cDNAs in an expression-ready vector; and (2) the need to biotinylate the plasmid DNA but not to interfere with transcription. Moreover, the resulting protein array is not ‘pure’ because the proteins are co-localized with their DNA templates and capture antibodies.

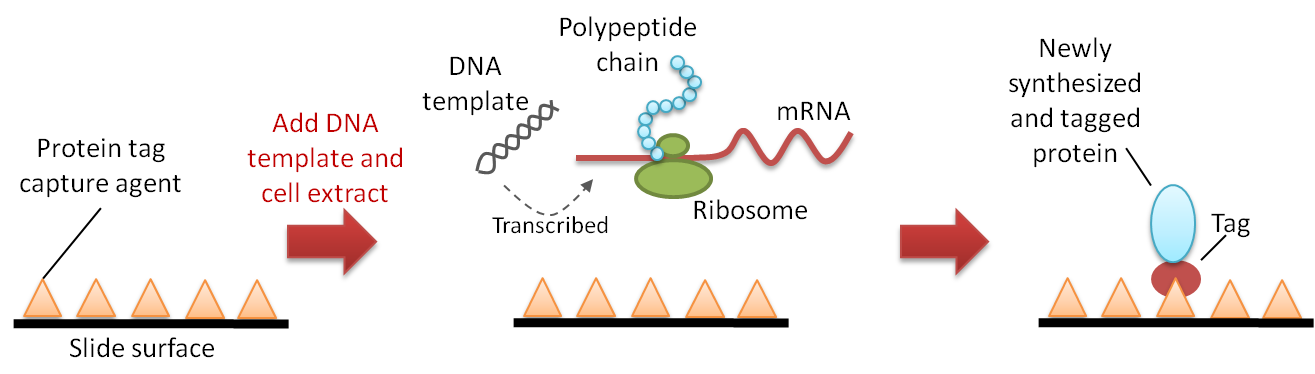
Diagram of PISA

==== Protein in situ array (PISA) ====
Unlike NAPPA, PISA completely bypasses DNA immobilization as the DNA template is added as a free molecule in the reaction mixture. In 2006, another group refined and miniaturized this method by using multiple spotting technique to spot the DNA template and cell-free transcription and translation mixture on a high-density protein microarray with up to 13,000 spots. This was made possible by the automated system used to accurately and sequentially supply the reagents for the transcription/translation reaction occurs in a small, sub-nanolitre droplet.

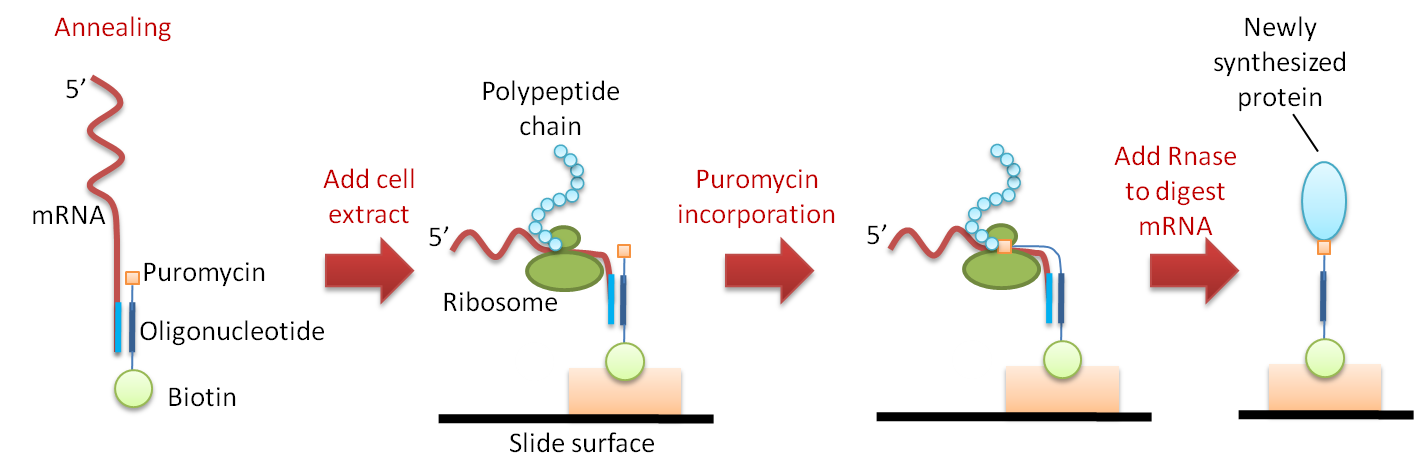
Diagram of In situ puromycin-capture

==== In situ puromycin-capture ====
This method is an adaptation of mRNA display technology. PCR DNA is first transcribed to mRNA, and a single-stranded DNA oligonucleotide modified with biotin and puromycin on each end is then hybridized to the 3’-end of the mRNA. The mRNAs are then arrayed on a slide and immobilized by the binding of biotin to streptavidin that is pre-coated on the slide. Cell extract is then dispensed on the slide for in situ translation to take place. When the ribosome reaches the hybridized oligonucleotide, it stalls and incorporates the puromycin molecule to the nascent polypeptide chain, thereby attaching the newly synthesized protein to the microarray via the DNA oligonucleotide. A pure protein array is obtained after the mRNA is digested with RNase. The protein spots generated by this method are very sharply defined and can be produced at a high density.

=== Nano-well array format ===
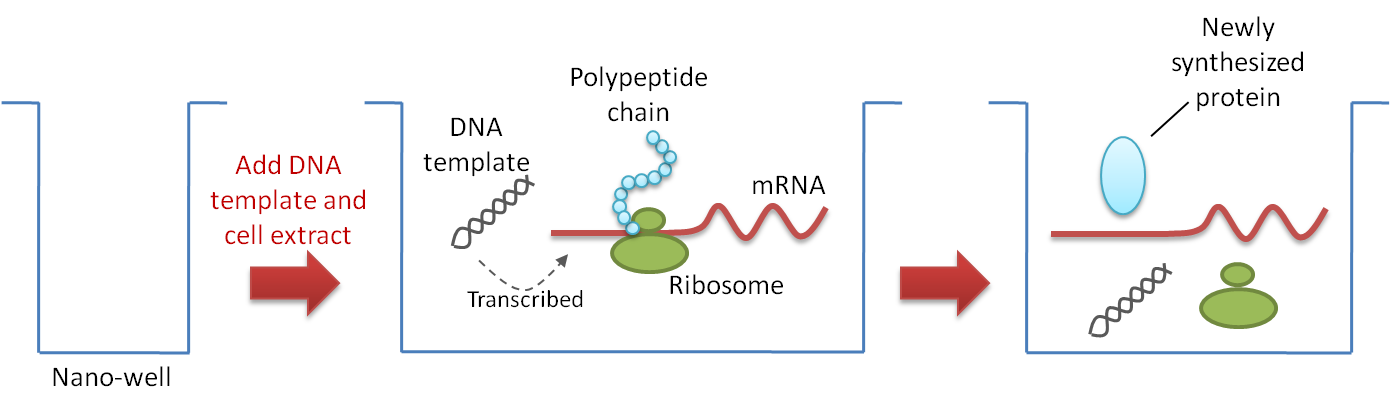
Figure 4: Schematic diagram of the nano-well array format

Nanowell array formats are used to express individual proteins in small volume reaction vessels or nanowells (Figure 4). This format is sometimes preferred because it avoids the need to immobilize the target protein which might result in the potential loss of protein activity. The miniaturization of the array also conserves solution and precious compounds that might be used in screening assays. Moreover, the structural properties of individual wells help to prevent cross-contamination among chambers. In 2012 an improved NAPPA was published, which used a nanowell array to prevent diffusion. Here the DNA was immobilized in the well together with an anti-GST antibody. Then cell-free expression mix was added and the wells closed by a lid. The nascent proteins containing a GST-tag were bound to the well surface enabling a NAPPA-array with higher density and nearly no cross-contaminations.

=== DNA array to protein array (DAPA) ===
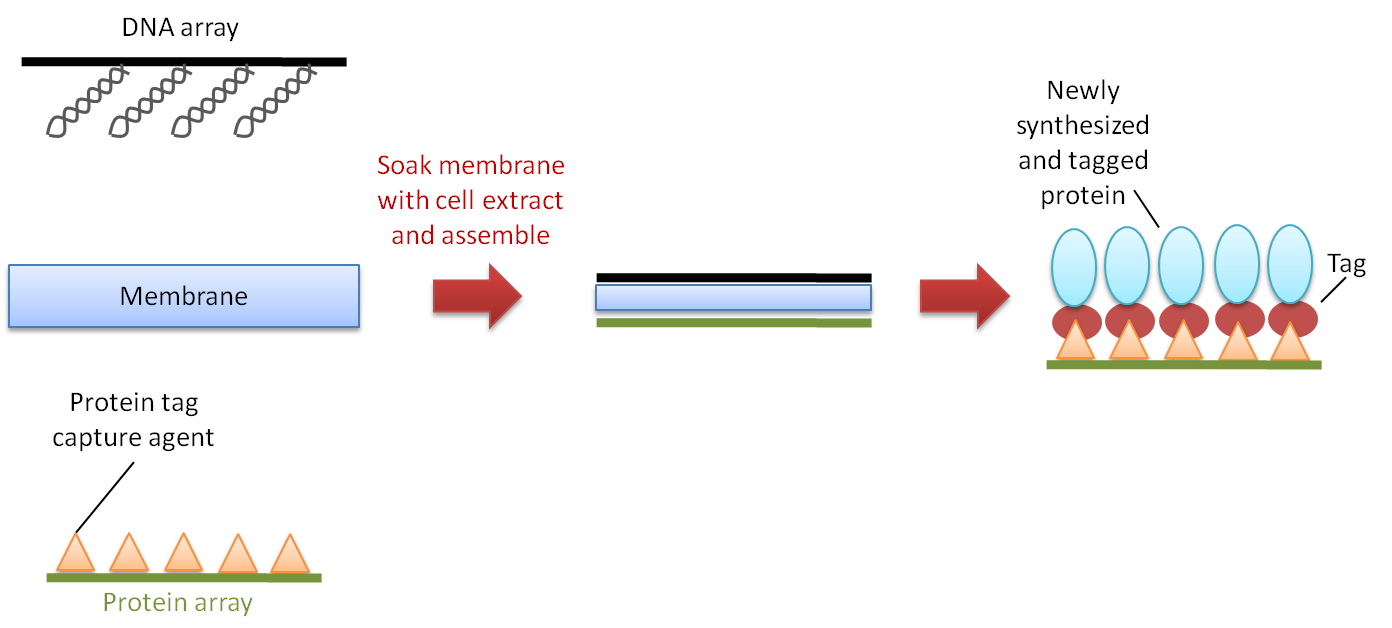
Figure 5: Schematic diagram of DAPA

DNA array to protein array (DAPA) is a method developed in 2007 to repeatedly produce protein arrays by ‘printing’ them from a single DNA template array, on demand (Figure 5). It starts with the spotting and immobilization of an array of DNA templates onto a glass slide. The slide is then assembled face-to-face with a second slide pre-coated with a protein-capturing reagent, and a membrane soaked with cell extract is placed between the two slides for transcription and translation to take place. The newly synthesized his-tagged proteins are then immobilized onto the slide to form the array. In the publication in 18 of 20 replications a protein microarray copy could be generated. Potentially the process can be repeated as often as needed, as long as the DNA is unharmed by DNAses, degradation or mechanical abrasion.

== Advantages ==
Many of the advantages of cell-free protein array technology address the limitations of cell-based expression system used in traditional methods of protein microarray production.

=== Rapid and cost-effective ===
The method avoids DNA cloning (with the exception of NAPPA) and can quickly convert genetic information into functional proteins by using PCR DNA. The reduced steps in production and the ability to miniaturize the system saves on reagent consumption and cuts production costs.

=== Improves protein availability ===
Many proteins, including antibodies, are difficult to express in host cells due to problems with insolubility, disulfide bonds or host cell toxicity. Cell-free protein array makes many of such proteins available for use in protein microarrays.

=== Enables long term storage ===
Unlike DNA, which is a highly stable molecule, proteins are a heterogeneous class of molecules with different stability and physiochemical properties. Maintaining the proteins’ folding and function in an immobilized state over long periods of storage is a major challenge for protein microarrays. Cell-free methods provide the option to quickly obtaining protein microarrays on demand, thus eliminating any problems associated with long-term storage.

=== Flexible ===
The method is amenable to a range of different templates: PCR products, plasmids and mRNA. Additional components can be included during synthesis to adjust the environment for protein folding, disulfide bond formation, modification or protein activity.

== Limitation ==
- Post-translational modification of proteins in proteins generated by cell-free protein synthesis is still limited compared to the traditional methods, and may not be as biologically relevant.

== Applications ==
Protein interactions: To screen for protein–protein interactions and protein interactions with other molecules such as metabolites, lipids, DNA and small molecules.; enzyme inhibition assay: for high throughput drug candidate screening and to discover novel enzymes for use in biotechnology; screening antibody specificity.
