= Reverse phase protein lysate microarray =

A reverse phase protein lysate microarray (RPMA) is a protein microarray designed as a dot-blot platform that allows measurement of protein expression levels in a large number of biological samples simultaneously in a quantitative manner when high-quality antibodies are available.

Technically, minuscule amounts of (a) cellular lysates, from intact cells or laser capture microdissected cells, (b) body fluids such as serum, CSF, urine, vitreous, saliva, etc., are immobilized on individual spots on a microarray that is then incubated with a single specific antibody to detect expression of the target protein across many samples. A summary video of RPPA is available. One microarray, depending on the design, can accommodate hundreds to thousands of samples that are printed in a series of replicates. Detection is performed using either a primary or a secondary labeled antibody by chemiluminescent, fluorescent or colorimetric assays. The array is then imaged and the obtained data is quantified.

Multiplexing is achieved by probing multiple arrays spotted with the same lysate with different antibodies simultaneously and can be implemented as a quantitative calibrated assay. In addition, since RPMA can utilize whole-cell or undissected or microdissected cell lysates, it can provide direct quantifiable information concerning post translationally modified proteins that are not accessible with other high-throughput techniques. Thus, RPMA provides high-dimensional proteomic data in a high throughput, sensitive and quantitative manner. However, since the signal generated by RPMA could be generated from unspecific primary or secondary antibody binding, as is seen in other techniques such as ELISA, or immunohistochemistry, the signal from a single spot could be due to cross-reactivity. Thus, the antibodies used in RPMA must be carefully validated for specificity and performance against cell lysates by western blot.

RPMA has various uses such as quantitative analysis of protein expression in cancer cells, body fluids or tissues for biomarker profiling, cell signaling analysis and clinical prognosis, diagnosis or therapeutic prediction. This is possible as a RPMA with lysates from different cell lines and or laser capture microdissected tissue biopsies of different disease stages from various organs of one or many patients can be constructed for determination of relative or absolute abundance or differential expression of a protein marker level in a single experiment. It is also used for monitoring protein dynamics in response to various stimuli or doses of drugs at multiple time points. Some other applications that RPMA is used for include exploring and mapping protein signaling pathways, evaluating molecular drug targets and understanding a candidate drug's mechanism of action. It has been also suggested as a potential early screen test in cancer patients to facilitate or guide therapeutic decision making.

Other protein microarrays include forward protein microarrays (PMAs) and antibody microarrays (AMAs). PMAs immobilize individual purified and sometimes denatured recombinant proteins on the microarray that are screened by antibodies and other small compounds. AMAs immobilize antibodies that capture analytes from the sample applied on the microarray. The target protein is detected either by direct labeling or a secondary labeled antibody against a different epitope on the analyte target protein (sandwich approach). Both PMAs and AMAs can be classified as forward phase arrays as they involve immobilization of a bait to capture an analyte. In forward phase arrays, each array is incubated with one test sample such as a cellular lysate or a patient's serum, but multiple analytes in the sample are tested simultaneously. Figure 1 shows a forward (using antibody as a bait in here) and reverse phase protein microarray at the molecular level.

== Experimental design and procedure ==
Depending on the research question or the type and aim of the study, RPMA can be designed by selecting the content of the array, the number of samples, sample placement within micro-plates, array layout, type of microarrayer, correct detection antibody, signal detection method, inclusion of control and quality control of the samples. The actual experiment is then set up in the laboratory and the results obtained are quantified and analyzed. The experimental stages are listed below:

=== Sample collection ===
Cells are grown in T-25 flasks at 37 degree and 5% CO_{2} in appropriate medium. Depending on the design of the study, after cells are confluent they could be treated with drugs, growth factors or they could be irradiated before lysis step. For time course studies, a stimulant is added to a set of flasks concurrently and the flasks are then processed at different time points. For drug dose studies, a set of flasks are treated with different doses of the drug and all the flasks are collected at the same time.

If a RPMA containing cell fraction lysates of a tissue/s is to be made, laser capture microdissection (LCM) or fine needle aspiration methods is used to isolate specific cells from a region of tissue microscopically.

=== Cell lysis ===
Pellets from cells collected through any of the above means are lysed with a cell lysis buffer to obtain high protein concentration.

=== Antibody screening ===
Aliquots of the lysates are pooled and resolved by two-dimensional single lane SDS-PAGE followed by western blotting on a nitrocellulose membrane. The membrane is cut into four-millimeter strips, and each strip is probed with a different antibody. Strips with single band indicate specific antibodies that are suitable for RPMA use. Antibody performance should be also validated with a smaller sample size under identical condition before actual sample collection for RPMA.

=== RPMA construction ===
Cell lysates are collected and are serially diluted six to ten times if using colorimetric techniques, or without dilution when fluorometric detection is used (due to the greater dynamic range of fluorescence than colorimetric detection). Serial dilutions are then plated in replicates into a 384- or a 1536-well microtiter plate. The lysates are then printed onto either nitrocellulose or PVDF membrane coated glass slides by a microarrayer such as Aushon BioSystem 2470 or Flexys robot (Genomic solution). Aushon 2470 with a solid pin system is the ideal choice as it can be used for producing arrays with very viscous lysates and it has humidity environmental control and automated slide supply system. That being said, there are published papers showing that Arrayit Microarray Printing Pins can also be used and produce microarrays with much higher throughput using less lysate. The membrane coated glass slides are commercially available from several different companies such as Schleicher and Schuell Bioscience (now owned by GE Whatman www.whatman.com), Grace BioLabs (www.gracebio.com), Thermo Scientific, and SCHOTT Nexterion (www.schott.com/nexterion).

=== Immunochemical signal detection ===
After the slides are printed, non-specific binding sites on the array are blocked using a blocking buffer such as I-Block and the arrays are probed with a primary antibody followed by a secondary antibody. Detection is usually conducted with DakoCytomation catalyzed signal amplification (CSA) system. For signal amplification, slides are incubated with streptavidin-biotin-peroxidase complex followed by biotinyl-tyramide/hydrogen peroxide and streptavidin-peroxidase. Development is completed using hydrogen peroxide and scans of the slides are obtained (1). Tyramide signal amplification works as follows: immobilized horseradish peroxidase (HRP) converts tyramide into reactive intermediate in the presence of hydrogen peroxide. Activated tyramide binds to neighboring proteins close to a site where the activating HRP enzyme is bound. This leads to more tyramide molecule deposition at the site; hence the signal amplification.

Lance Liotta and Emanual Petricoin invented the RPMA technique in 2001 (see history section below), and have developed a multiplexed detection method using near-infrared fluorescent techniques. In this study, they report the use of a dual dye-based approach that can effectively double the number of endpoints observed per array, allowing, for example, both phospho-specific and total protein levels to be measured and analyzed at once.

=== Data quantification and analysis ===
Once immunostaining has been performed protein expression must then be quantified. The signal levels can be obtained by using the reflective mode of an ordinary optical flatbed scanner if a colorimetric detection technique is used or by laser scanning, such as with a TECAN LS system, if fluorescent techniques are used. Two programs available online (P-SCAN and ProteinScan) can then be used to convert the scanned image into numerical values. These programs quantify signal intensities at each spot and use a dose interpolation algorithm (DI_{25}) to compute a single normalized protein expression level value for each sample. Normalization is necessary to account for differences in total protein concentration between each sample and so that antibody staining can be directly compared between samples. This can be achieved by performing an experiment in parallel in which total proteins are stained by colloidal gold total protein staining or Sypro Ruby total protein staining. When multiple RPMAs are analyzed, the signal intensity values can be displayed as a heat map, allowing for Bayesian clustering analysis and profiling of signaling pathways. An optimal software tool, custom designed for RPMAs is called Microvigene, by Vigene Tech, Inc.

== Strengths ==
The greatest strength of RPMAs is that they allow for high throughput, multiplexed, ultra-sensitive detection of proteins from extremely small numbers of input material, a feat which cannot be done by conventional western blotting or ELISA. The small spot size on the microarray, ranging in diameter from 85 to 200 micrometres, enables the analysis of thousands of samples with the same antibody in one experiment. RPMAs have increased sensitivity and are capable of detecting proteins in the picogram range. Some researchers have even reported detection of proteins in the attogram range. This is a significant improvement over protein detection by ELISA, which requires microgram amounts of protein (6). The increase in sensitivity of RPMAs is due to the miniature format of the array, which leads to an increase in the signal density (signal intensity/area) coupled with tyramide deposition-enabled enhancement. The high sensitivity of RPMAs allows for the detection of low abundance proteins or biomarkers such as phosphorylated signaling proteins from very small amounts of starting material such as biopsy samples, which are often contaminated with normal tissue. Using laser capture microdissection lysates can be analyzed from as few as 10 cells, with each spot containing less than a hundredth of a cell equivalent of protein.

A great improvement of RPMAs over traditional forward phase protein arrays is a reduction in the number of antibodies needed to detect a protein. Forward phase protein arrays typically use a sandwich method to capture and detect the desired protein. This implies that there must be two epitopes on the protein (one to capture the protein and one to detect the protein) for which specific antibodies are available. Other forward phase protein microarrays directly label the samples, however there is often variability in the labeling efficiency for different protein, and often the labeling destroys the epitope to which the antibody binds. This problem is overcome by RPMAs as sample need not be labeled directly.

Another strength of RPMAs over forward phase protein microarrays and western blotting is the uniformity of results, as all samples on the chip are probed with the same primary and secondary antibody and the same concentration of amplification reagents for the same length of time. This allows for the quantification of differences in protein levels across all samples. Furthermore, printing each sample, on the chip in serial dilution (colorimetric) provides an internal control to ensure analysis is performed only in the linear dynamic range of the assay. Optimally, printing of calibrators and high and low controls directly on the same chip will then provide for unmatched ability to quantitatively measure each protein over time and between experiments. A problem that is encountered with tissue microarrays is antigen retrieval and the inherent subjectivity of immunohistochemistry. Antibodies, especially phospho-specific reagents, often detect linear peptide sequences that may be masked due to the three-dimensional conformation of the protein. This problem is overcome with RPMAs as the samples can be denatured, revealing any concealed epitopes.

== Weaknesses ==
The biggest limitation of RPMA, as is the case for all immunoassays, is its dependence on antibodies for detection of proteins. Currently there is a limited but rapidly growing number of signaling proteins for which antibodies exist that give an analyzable signal. In addition, finding the appropriate antibody could require extensive screening of many antibodies by western blotting prior to beginning RPMA analysis. To overcome this issue, two open resource databases have been created to display western blot results for antibodies that have good binding specificity within the expected range. Furthermore, RPMAs, unlike western blots, do not resolve protein fractions by molecular weight. Thus, it is critical that upfront antibody validation be performed.

== History ==
RPMA was first introduced in 2001 in a paper by Lance Liotta and Emanuel Petricoin who invented the technology. The authors used the technique to successfully analyze the state of pro-survival checkpoint protein at the microscopic transition stage using laser capture microdissection of histologically normal prostate epithelium, prostate intraepithelial neoplasia, and patient-matched invasive prostate cancer. Since then RPMA has been used in many basic biology, translational and clinical research. In addition, the technique has now been brought into clinical trials for the first time whereby patients with metastatic colorectal and breast cancers are chosen for therapy based on the results of the RPMA. This technique has been commercialized for personalized medicine-based applications by Theranostics Health, Inc.
