= Reverse transfection =

Reverse transfection is a technique for the transfer of genetic material into cells. As DNA is printed on a glass slide for the transfection process (the deliberate introduction of nucleic acids into cells) to occur before the addition of adherent cells, the order of addition of DNA and adherent cells is reverse that of conventional transfection. Hence, the word “reverse” is used.

== Process ==
=== Transfection-mix preparation for slide printing ===
A DNA-gelatin mixture may be used for printing onto a slide. Gelatin powder is first dissolved in sterile Milli-Q water to form a 0.2% gelatin solution. Purified DNA plasmid is then mixed with the gelatin solution, and the final gelatin concentration is kept greater than 0.17%. Besides gelatin, atelocollagen and fibronectin are also successful transfection vectors for introducing foreign DNA into the cell nucleus.

=== Slide printing of DNA-gelatin mixture ===
After the DNA-gelatin mixture preparation, the mixture is pipetted onto a slide surface and the slide is placed in a covered petri dish. A desiccant is added to the dish to dry up the solution. Finally, cultured cells are poured into the dish for plasmid uptake. However, with the invention of different types of microarray printing systems, hundreds of transfection mixes (containing different DNA of interest) may be printed on the same slide for cell uptake of plasmids. There are two major types of microarray printing systems manufactured by different companies: contact and non-contact printing systems.

An example of a non-contact printing system is the Piezorray Flexible Non-contact Microarraying System. It uses pressure control and a piezoelectric collar to squeeze out consistent drops of approximately 333 pL in volume. The PiezoTip dispensers do not contact the surface to which the sample is dispensed; thus, contamination potential is reduced and the risk of disrupting the target surface is eliminated. An example of a contact printing system is the SpotArray 72 (Perkin Elmer Life Sciences) contact-spotting system. Its printhead can accommodate up to 48 pins, and creates compact arrays by selectively raising and lowering subsets of pins during printing. After printing, the pins are washed with a powerful pressure-jet pin washer and vacuum-dried, eliminating carryover. Another example of a contact printing system is the Qarray system (Genetix). It has three types of printing systems: QArray Mini, QArray 2 and QArray Max. After printing, the solution is allowed to dry up and the DNA-gelatin is stuck tightly in position on the array.

=== HybriWell in reverse transfection ===
First, adhesive from the HybriWell is peeled off and the HybriWell is attached over the area of the slide printed with the gelatin-DNA solution. Second, 200ul of transfection mix is pipetted into one of the HybriWell ports; the mixture will distribute evenly over the array. The array is then incubated, with temperature and time dependent on the cell types used. Third, the transfection mix is pipetted away and the HybriWell removed with a thin-tipped forceps. Fourth, the printed slide treated with transfection reagent is placed into a square dish with the printed side facing up. Fifth, the harvested cells are gently poured onto the slides (not on the printed areas). Finally, the dish is placed in a 37 °C, 5% CO_{2} humidified incubator and incubated overnight.

=== Other reverse-transfection reagents ===
Effectene Reagent is used in conjunction with the enhancer and the DNA condensation buffer (Buffer EC) to achieve high transfection efficiency. In the first step of Effectene–DNA complex formation, the DNA is condensed by interaction with the enhancer in a defined-buffer system. Effectene Reagent is then added to the condensed DNA to produce condensed Effectene–DNA complexes. The Effectene–DNA complexes are mixed with the medium and directly added to the cells. Effectene Reagent spontaneously forms micelle structures exhibiting no size or batch variation (as may be found with pre-formulated liposome reagents). This feature ensures reproducibility of transfection-complex formation. The process of highly condensing DNA molecules and then coating them with Effectene Reagent is an effective way to transfer DNA into eukaryotic cells.

== Advantages and disadvantages ==
The advantages of reverse transfection (over conventional transfection) are:

- The addition and attachment of target cells to the DNA-loaded surface can lead to a higher probability of cell-DNA contact, potentially leading to higher transfection efficiency.
- Labour-saving materials (less DNA is required)
- High-throughput screening; hundreds of genes may be expressed in cells on a single microarray for studying gene expression and regulation.
- Parallel cell seeding in a single chamber for 384 experiments, with no physical separation between experiments, increases screening data quality. Well-to-well variations occur in experiments performed in multi-wall dishes.
- Exact-replicate arrays may be produced, since the same sample source plate may be dried and printed on different slides for at least 15 months' storage without apparent loss of transfection efficiency.

The disadvantages of reverse transfection are:

- Reverse transfection is more expensive because a highly accurate and efficient microarray printing system is needed to print the DNA-gelatin solution onto the slides.
- Applications with different cell lines have (so far) required protocol variations to manufacture siRNA or plasmid arrays, which involve considerable development and testing.
- Increased possibility of array-spot cross-contamination as spot density increases; therefore, optimization of the array layout is important.
