= Off-stoichiometry thiol-ene polymer =

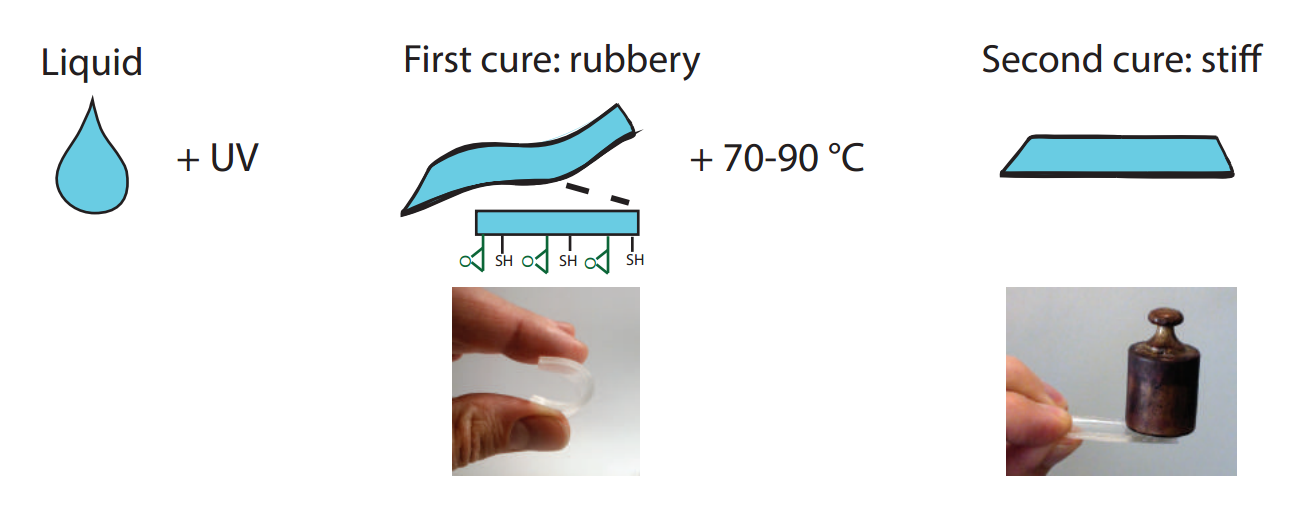
Example of the curing process of the OSTE+ polymers. The respective properties of the polymer after 1st and 2nd cure.

An off-stoichiometry thiol-ene polymer is a polymer platform comprising off-stoichiometry thiol-enes (OSTE) and off-stoichiometry thiol-ene-epoxies (OSTE+).

The OSTE polymers comprise off-stoichiometry blends of thiols and allyls. After complete polymerization, typically by UV micromolding, the polymer articles contain a well-defined number of unreacted thiol or allyl groups both on the surface and in the bulk. These surface anchors can be used for subsequent direct surface modification or bonding.

In later versions epoxy monomers were added to form ternary thiol-ene-epoxy monomer systems (OSTE+), where the epoxy in a second step reacts with the excess of thiols creating a final polymer article that is completely inert. Some of the critical features of OSTE+ polymers include uncomplicated and rapid fabrication of complex structures in a standard chemistry labs, hydrophilic native surface properties and covalent bonding via latent epoxy chemistry.

== Development ==
The OSTE polymer resins were originally developed by Tommy Haraldsson and Fredrik Carlborg at the group of Micro and Nanosystems at the Royal Institute of Technology (KTH) to bridge the gap between research prototyping and commercial production of microfluidics devices. The resins were later adapted and improved for commercial applications by the Swedish start-up Mercene Labs AB under the name OSTEMER.

== Reaction mechanism ==
The OSTE resins are cured via a rapid thiol-ene "Click" reaction between thiols and allyls. The thiols and allyls react in a perfectly alternating fashion and has a very high conversion rate (up to 99%), the initial off-stoichiometry of the monomers will exactly define the number off unreacted groups left after the polymerization. With the right choice of monomers very high off-stoichiometry ratios can be attained while maintaining good mechanical properties.

The off-stoichiometry thiol-ene-epoxies, or OSTE+ polymers, are created in a two-step curing process where a first rapid thiol-ene reaction defines the geometric shape of the polymer while leaving an excess of thiols and all the epoxy unreacted. In a second step all the remaining thiol groups and the epoxy groups are reacted to form an inert polymer.

== Properties ==
=== OSTE polymers ===
The main advantages put forward of the UV-cured OSTE polymers in microsystems have been their i) dry bonding capacity by reacting a polymer with thiol excess to a second polymer with allyl excess at room-temperature using only UV-light, ii) their well-defined and tunable number of surface anchors (thiols or allyls) present on the surface that can be used for direct surface modification and iii) their wide tuning range of mechanical properties from rubbery to thermoplastic-like depending only on the choice of off-stoichiometry. The glass transition temperature typically varies from below room-temperature for high off-stoichiometric ratios to 75 °C for a stoichiometric blend of tetrathiol and triallyl. They are typically transparent in the visible range. A disadvantage put forward with the OSTE-polymers is the leaching out of unreacted monomers at very high off-stoichiometric ratios which may affect cells and proteins in lab-on-chips, although cell viability has been observed for cell cultures on low off-stoichiometric OSTE.

=== OSTE+ polymers ===
The dual-cure thiol-ene-epoxies, or OSTE+ polymers, differ from the OSTE-polymers in that they have two separated curing steps. After the first UV-initiated step, the polymer is rubbery and can easily be deformed and it has surface anchors available for surface modification. During the second step, when all the thiols and epoxies are reacted the polymer stiffens and can bond to a wide number of substrates, including itself, via the epoxy chemistry. The advantages put forward for the OSTE+ are i) their unique ability for integration and bonding via the latent epoxy chemistry and the low built-in stresses in the thiol-enes polymers ii) their complete inertness after final cure iii) their good barrier properties and the possibility to scale up manufacturing using industrial reaction injection molding. Both stiff and rubbery versions of the OSTE+ polymers have been demonstrated, showing their potential in microsystems for valving and pumping similar to PDMS components, but with the benefit of withstanding higher pressures. The commercial version of the OSTE+ polymer, OSTEMER 322, has been shown to be compatible with many cell lines.

== Fabrication ==
=== OSTE polymers ===
The OSTE resins can be cast and cured in a structured silicone molds or coated permanent photoresist. OSTE polymers have also shown excellent photostructuring capability using photomasks, enabling for example powerful and flexible capillary pumps.

=== OSTE+ polymers ===
The OSTE+ resins are first UV-cured in the same way as the OSTE-polymers but are later thermally cured to stiffen and bond to a substrate.

== Applications ==
=== Lab-on-a-chip ===
OSTE+ allows for soft lithography microstructuring, strong biocompatible dry bonding to almost any substrate during Lab-on-a-chip (LoC) manufacturing, while simultaneously mimicking the mechanical properties found in thermoplastic polymers, hence allowing for true prototyping of commercial LoC. The commonly used materials for microfluidics suffer from unwieldy steps and often ineffective bonding processes, especially when packaging biofunctionalized surfaces, which makes LoC assembly difficult and costly OSTE+ polymer which effectively bonds to nine dissimilar types of substrates, requires no surface treatment prior to the bonding at room temperature, features high Tg, and achieves good bonding strength to at least 100 °C. Moreover, it has been demonstrated that excellent results can be obtained using photolithography on OSTE polymer, opening wider potential applications.

=== Bio packaging ===
Biosensors are used for a range of biological measurements.

OSTE packaging for biosensing has been demonstrated for QCM, and photonic ring resonator sensors.

=== Wafer bonding ===
Adhesive wafer bonding has become an established technology in microelectromechanical systems (MEMS) integration and packaging applications. OSTE is suitable for heterogeneous silicon wafer level integration depending on its application in low temperature processes due to its ability to cure even in room temperatures.

=== Microarray imprinting and surface energy patterning ===
Imprinting of arrays with hydrophilic-in-hydrophobic microwells uses surface energy replication approach by means of a hydrophobic thiol-ene polymer formulation. In this polymer, hydrophobic-moiety-containing monomers self-assemble at the hydrophobic surface of the imprinting stamp, which results in a hydrophobic replica surface after polymerization. After removing the stamp, microwells with hydrophobic walls and a hydrophilic bottom are obtained. This procedure may be utilised in digital microwell array technology toward diagnostic applications.

=== OSTE e-beam resist ===
OSTE resin can also be used as e-beam resist, resulting in nanostructures that allow direct protein functionalization.
