= Tissue microarray =

Tissue arrangement technique

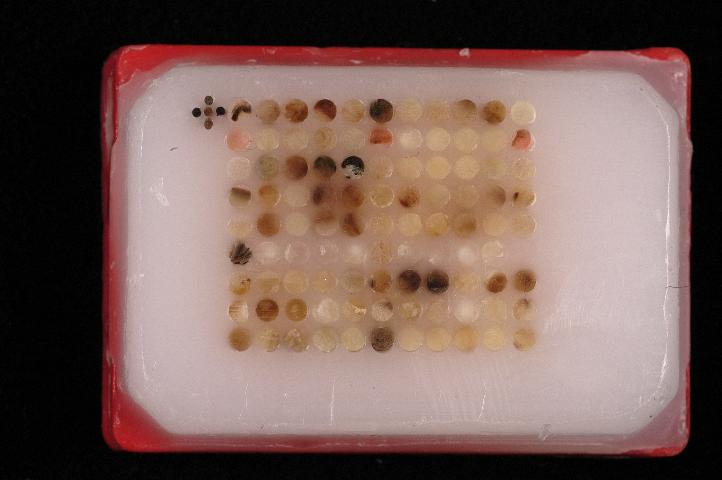
A Tissue MicroArray Block

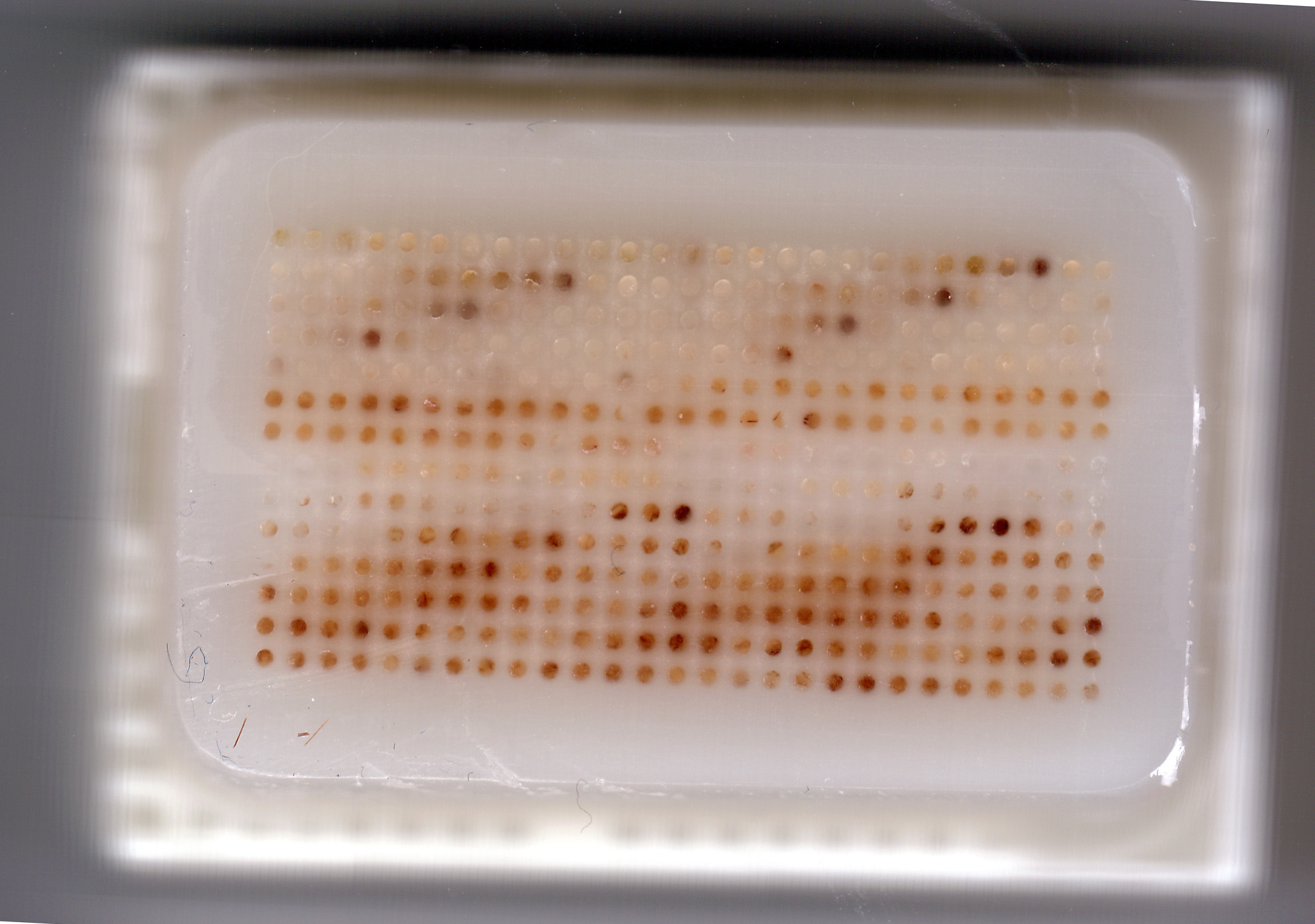
0.6 mm core Tissue MicroArray Block

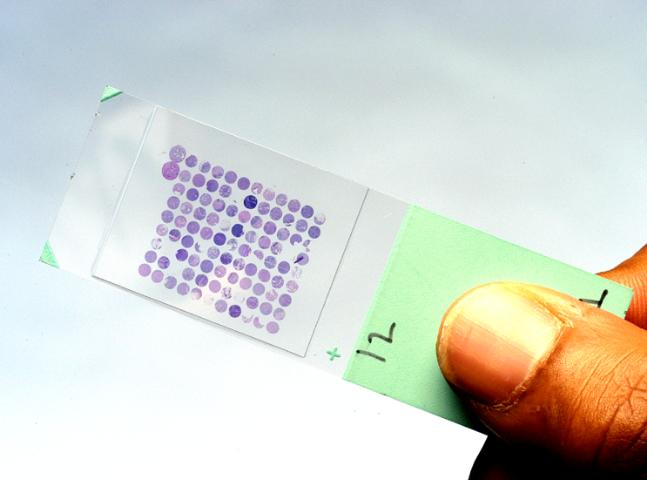
A Tissue MicroArray Section

Tissue microarrays (also TMAs) consist of paraffin blocks in which up to 1000 separate tissue cores are assembled in array fashion to allow multiplex histological analysis.

== History ==
The major limitations in molecular clinical analysis of tissues include the cumbersome nature of procedures, limited availability of diagnostic reagents and limited patient sample size. The technique of tissue microarray was developed to address these issues.

Multi-tissue blocks were first introduced by H. Battifora in 1986 with his so-called "multitumor (sausage) tissue block" and modified in 1990 with its improvement, "the checkerboard tissue block" . In 1998, J. Kononen and collaborators developed the current technique, which uses a novel sampling approach to produce tissues of regular size and shape that can be more densely and precisely arrayed.

== Procedure ==
In the tissue microarray technique, a hollow needle is used to remove tissue cores as small as 0.6 mm in diameter from regions of interest in paraffin-embedded tissues such as clinical biopsies or tumor samples. These tissue cores are then inserted in a recipient paraffin block in a precisely spaced, array pattern. Sections from this block are cut using a microtome, mounted on a microscope slide and then analyzed by any method of standard histological analysis. Each microarray block can be cut into 100 – 500 sections, which can be subjected to independent tests. Tests commonly employed in tissue microarray include immunohistochemistry, and fluorescent in situ hybridization. Tissue microarrays are particularly useful in analysis of cancer samples.

One variation is a Frozen tissue array.

== Use in research ==
The use of tissue microarrays in combination with immunohistochemistry has been a preferred method to study and validate cancer biomarkers in various defined cancer patient cohorts. The possibility to assemble a large number of representative cancer samples from a defined patient cohort that also has a corresponding clinical database, provides a powerful resource to study how different protein expression patterns correlate with different clinical parameters. Since patient samples are assembled into the same block, sections can be stained with the same protocol to avoid experimental variability and technical artefacts. Clinical cancer patient cohorts and corresponding tissue microarray sets have been used to study diagnostic, prognostic and treatment predictive cancer biomarkers in most forms of cancer, including lung, breast, colorectal and renal cell cancer.

Immunohistochemistry combined with tissue microarrays has also been used with success in large scale efforts to create a map of protein expression on a more global scale.

== See also ==
- Cytomics
