= Multiplex (assay) =

In the biological sciences, a multiplex assay is a type of immunoassay that uses magnetic beads to simultaneously measure multiple analytes in a single experiment. A multiplex assay is a derivative of an ELISA using beads for binding the capture antibody. Multiplex assays are still more common in research than in clinical settings.

In a multiplex assay, microspheres of designated colors are coated with antibodies of defined binding specificities. The results can be read by flow cytometry because the beads are distinguishable by fluorescent signature. The number of analytes measured is determined by the number of different bead colors.

Multiplex assays within a given application area or class of technology can be further stratified based on how many analytes can be measured per assay, where "multiplex" refers to those with the highest number of analyte measurements per assay (up to millions) and "low-plex" or "mid-plex" refers to procedures that process fewer (10s to 1000s), though there are no formal guidelines for calling a procedure multi-, mid-, or low-plex based on number of analytes measured. Single-analyte assays or low-to-mid-plex procedures typically predate the rise of their multiplex versions, which often require specialized technologies or miniaturization to achieve a higher degree of parallelization.
