= Protein microarray =

Device for tracking proteins

A protein microarray (or protein chip) is a high-throughput method used to track the interactions and activities of proteins, and to determine their function, and determining function on a large scale. Its main advantage lies in the fact that large numbers of proteins can be tracked in parallel. The chip consists of a support surface such as a glass slide, nitrocellulose membrane, bead, or microtitre plate, to which an array of capture proteins is bound. Probe molecules, typically labeled with a fluorescent dye, are added to the array. Any reaction between the probe and the immobilised protein emits a fluorescent signal that is read by a laser scanner. Protein microarrays are rapid, automated, economical, and highly sensitive, consuming small quantities of samples and reagents. The concept and methodology of protein microarrays was first introduced and illustrated in antibody microarrays (also referred to as antibody matrix) in 1983 in a scientific publication and a series of patents. The high-throughput technology behind the protein microarray was relatively easy to develop since it is based on the technology developed for DNA microarrays, which have become the most widely used microarrays.

== Motivation for development ==
Protein microarrays were developed due to the limitations of using DNA microarrays for determining gene expression levels in proteomics. The quantity of mRNA in the cell often doesn't reflect the expression levels of the proteins they correspond to. Since it is usually the protein, rather than the mRNA, that has the functional role in cell response, a novel approach was needed. Additionally post-translational modifications, which are often critical for determining protein function, are not visible on DNA microarrays. Protein microarrays replace traditional proteomics techniques such as 2D gel electrophoresis or chromatography, which were time-consuming, labor-intensive and ill-suited for the analysis of low abundant proteins.

== Making the array ==
The proteins are arrayed onto a solid surface such as microscope slides, membranes, beads or microtitre plates. The function of this surface is to provide a support onto which proteins can be immobilized. It should demonstrate maximal binding properties, whilst maintaining the protein in its native conformation so that its binding ability is retained. Microscope slides made of glass or silicon are a popular choice since they are compatible with the easily obtained robotic arrayers and laser scanners that have been developed for DNA microarray technology. Nitrocellulose film slides are broadly accepted as the highest protein binding substrate for protein microarray applications.

The chosen solid surface is then covered with a coating that must serve the simultaneous functions of immobilising the protein, preventing its denaturation, orienting it in the appropriate direction so that its binding sites are accessible, and providing a hydrophilic environment in which the binding reaction can occur. It also needs to display minimal non-specific binding in order to minimize background noise in the detection systems. Furthermore, it needs to be compatible with different detection systems. Immobilising agents include layers of aluminium or gold, hydrophilic polymers, and polyacrylamide gels, or treatment with amines, aldehyde or epoxy. Thin-film technologies like physical vapour deposition (PVD) and chemical vapour deposition (CVD) are employed to apply the coating to the support surface.

An aqueous environment is essential at all stages of array manufacture and operation to prevent protein denaturation. Therefore, sample buffers contain a high percent of glycerol (to lower the freezing point), and the humidity of the manufacturing environment is carefully regulated. Microwells have the dual advantage of providing an aqueous environment while preventing cross-contamination between samples.

In the most common type of protein array, robots place large numbers of proteins or their ligands onto a coated solid support in a pre-defined pattern. This is known as robotic contact printing or robotic spotting. Another fabrication method is ink-jetting, a drop-on-demand, non-contact method of dispersing the protein polymers onto the solid surface in the desired pattern. Piezoelectric spotting is a similar method to ink-jet printing. The printhead moves across the array, and at each spot uses electric stimulation to deliver the protein molecules onto the surface via tiny jets. This is also a non-contact process. Photolithography is a fourth method of arraying the proteins onto the surface. Light is used in association with photomasks, opaque plates with holes or transparencies that allow light to shine through in a defined pattern. A series of chemical treatments then enables deposition of the protein in the desired pattern upon the material underneath the photomask.

The capture molecules arrayed on the solid surface may be antibodies, antigens, aptamers (nucleic acid-based ligands), affibodies (small molecules engineered to mimic monoclonal antibodies), or full length proteins. Sources of such proteins include cell-based expression systems for recombinant proteins, purification from natural sources, production in vitro by cell-free translation systems, and synthetic methods for peptides. Many of these methods can be automated for high throughput production but care must be taken to avoid conditions of synthesis or extraction that result in a denatured protein which, since it no longer recognizes its binding partner, renders the array useless.

Proteins are highly sensitive to changes in their microenvironment. This presents a challenge in maintaining protein arrays in a stable condition over extended periods of time. In situ methods—invented and published by Mingyue He and Michael Taussig in 2001—involve on-chip synthesis of proteins as and when required, directly from the DNA using cell-free protein expression systems. Since DNA is a highly stable molecule it does not deteriorate over time and is therefore suited to long-term storage. This approach is also advantageous in that it circumvents the laborious and often costly processes of separate protein purification and DNA cloning, since proteins are made and immobilised simultaneously in a single step on the chip surface. Examples of in situ techniques are PISA (protein in situ array), NAPPA (nucleic acid programmable protein array) and DAPA (DNA array to protein array).

== Types of arrays ==
Types of protein arrays

There are three types of protein microarrays that are currently used to study the biochemical activities of proteins.

Analytical microarrays are also known as capture arrays. In this technique, a library of antibodies, aptamers or affibodies is arrayed on the support surface. These are used as capture molecules since each binds specifically to a particular protein. The array is probed with a complex protein solution such as a cell lysate. Analysis of the resulting binding reactions using various detection systems can provide information about expression levels of particular proteins in the sample as well as measurements of binding affinities and specificities. This type of microarray is especially useful in comparing protein expression in different solutions. For instance the response of the cells to a particular factor can be identified by comparing the lysates of cells treated with specific substances or grown under certain conditions with the lysates of control cells. Another application is in the identification and profiling of diseased tissues.

Reverse phase protein microarray (RPPA) involve complex samples, such as tissue lysates. Cells are isolated from various tissues of interest and are lysed. The lysate is arrayed onto the microarray and probed with antibodies against the target protein of interest. These antibodies are typically detected with chemiluminescent, fluorescent or colorimetric assays. Reference peptides are printed on the slides to allow for protein quantification of the sample lysates. RPAs allow for the determination of the presence of altered proteins or other agents that may be the result of disease. Specifically, post-translational modifications, which are typically altered as a result of disease can be detected using RPAs.

== Functional protein microarrays ==
Functional protein microarrays (also known as target protein arrays) are constructed by immobilising large numbers of purified proteins and are used to identify protein–protein, protein–DNA, protein–RNA, protein–phospholipid, and protein–small-molecule interactions, to assay enzymatic activity and to detect antibodies and demonstrate their specificity. They differ from analytical arrays in that functional protein arrays are composed of arrays containing full-length functional proteins or protein domains. These protein chips are used to study the biochemical activities of the entire proteome in a single experiment.

The key element in any functional protein microarray-based assay is the arrayed proteins must retain their native structure, such that meaningful functional interactions can take place on the array surface. The advantages of controlling the precise mode of surface attachment through use of an appropriate affinity tag are that the immobilised proteins will have a homogeneous orientation resulting in a higher specific activity and higher signal-to-noise ratio in assays, with less interference from non-specific interactions.

== Detection ==
Protein array detection methods must give a high signal and a low background. The most common and widely used method for detection is fluorescence labeling which is highly sensitive, safe and compatible with readily available microarray laser scanners. Other labels can be used, such as affinity, photochemical or radioisotope tags. These labels are attached to the probe itself and can interfere with the probe-target protein reaction. Therefore, a number of label free detection methods are available, such as surface plasmon resonance (SPR), carbon nanotubes, carbon nanowire sensors (where detection occurs via changes in conductance) and microelectromechanical system (MEMS) cantilevers. All these label free detection methods are relatively new and are not yet suitable for high-throughput protein interaction detection; however, they do offer much promise for the future. Immunoassays on thiol-ene "synthetic paper" micropillar scaffolds have shown to generate a superior fluorescence signal.

Protein quantitation on nitrocellulose coated glass slides can use near-IR fluorescent detection. This limits interferences due to auto-fluorescence of the nitrocellulose at the UV wavelengths used for standard fluorescent detection probes.

== Applications ==
There are five major areas where protein arrays are being applied: diagnostics, proteomics, protein functional analysis, antibody characterization, and treatment development.

Diagnostics involves the detection of antigens and antibodies in blood samples; the profiling of sera to discover new disease biomarkers; the monitoring of disease states and responses to therapy in personalized medicine; the monitoring of environment and food. Digital bioassay is an example of using protein microarray for diagnostic purposes. In this technology, an array of microwells on a glass/polymer chip are seeded with magnetic beads (coated with fluorescent tagged antibodies), subjected to targeted antigens and then characterised by a microscope through counting fluorescing wells. A cost-effective fabrication platform (using OSTE polymers) for such microwell arrays has been recently demonstrated and the bio-assay model system has been successfully characterised.

Proteomics pertains to protein expression profiling i.e. which proteins are expressed in the lysate of a particular cell.

Protein functional analysis is the identification of protein–protein interactions (e.g. identification of members of a protein complex), protein–phospholipid interactions, small molecule targets, enzymatic substrates (particularly the substrates of kinases) and receptor ligands.

Antibody characterization is characterizing cross-reactivity, specificity and mapping epitopes.

Microarrays can also be used for detecting autoantibodies, utilizing autoantigen arrays to screen against many antigens or potential antigens in parallel.

Treatment development involves the development of antigen-specific therapies for autoimmunity, cancer and allergies; the identification of small molecule targets that could potentially be used as new drugs.

== Challenges ==
Despite the considerable investments made by several companies, proteins chips have yet to flood the market. Manufacturers have found that proteins are actually quite difficult to handle. Production of reliable, consistent, high-throughput proteins that are correctly folded and functional is fraught with difficulties as they often result in low-yield of proteins due to decreased solubility and formation of inclusion bodies. A protein chip requires a lot more steps in its creation than does a DNA chip.

There are a number of approaches to this problem which differ fundamentally according to whether the proteins are immobilised through non-specific, poorly defined interactions, or through a specific set of known interactions. The former approach is attractive in its simplicity and is compatible with purified proteins derived from native or recombinant sources but suffers from a number of risks. Most notable amongst these relate to the uncontrolled nature of the interactions between each protein and the surface; at best, this might give rise to a heterogeneous population of proteins in which active sites are sometimes occluded by the surface; at worst, it might destroy activity altogether due to partial or complete surface-mediated unfolding of the immobilised protein.

Challenges include: 1) finding a surface and a method of attachment that allows the proteins to maintain their secondary or tertiary structure and thus their biological activity and their interactions with other molecules, 2) producing an array with a long shelf life so that the proteins on the chip do not denature over a short time, 3) identifying and isolating antibodies or other capture molecules against every protein in the human genome, 4) quantifying the levels of bound protein while assuring sensitivity and avoiding background noise, 5) extracting the detected protein from the chip in order to further analyze it, 6) reducing non-specific binding by the capture agents, 7) the capacity of the chip must be sufficient to allow as complete a representation of the proteome to be visualized as possible; abundant proteins overwhelm the detection of less abundant proteins such as signaling molecules and receptors, which are generally of more therapeutic interest.

== See also ==
- Microarray imprinting and surface energy patterning
