= Assay =

Measure the amount of a target entity

An assay is an investigative (analytic) procedure in laboratory medicine, mining, pharmacology, environmental biology and molecular biology for qualitatively assessing or quantitatively measuring the presence, amount, or functional activity of a target entity. The measured entity is often called the analyte, the measurand, or the target of the assay. The analyte can be a drug, biochemical substance, chemical element or compound, or cell in an organism or organic sample. An assay usually aims to measure an analyte's intensive property and express it in the relevant measurement unit (e.g. molarity, density, functional activity in enzyme international units, degree of effect in comparison to a standard, etc.).

If the assay involves exogenous reactants (the reagents), then their quantities are kept fixed (or in excess) so that the quantity and quality of the target are the only limiting factors. The difference in the assay outcome is used to deduce the unknown quality or quantity of the target in question. Some assays (e.g., biochemical assays) may be similar to chemical analysis and titration. However, assays typically involve biological material or phenomena that are intrinsically more complex in composition or behavior, or both. Thus, reading of an assay may be noisy and involve greater difficulties in interpretation than an accurate chemical titration. On the other hand, older generation qualitative assays, especially bioassays, may be much more gross and less quantitative (e.g., counting death or dysfunction of an organism or cells in a population, or some descriptive change in some body part of a group of animals).

Assays have become a routine part of modern medical, environmental, pharmaceutical, and forensic technology. Other businesses may also employ them at the industrial, curbside, or field levels. Assays in high commercial demand have been well investigated in research and development sectors of professional industries. They have also undergone generations of development and sophistication. In some cases, they are protected by intellectual property regulations such as patents granted for inventions. Such industrial-scale assays are often performed in well-equipped laboratories and with automated organization of the procedure, from ordering an assay to pre-analytic sample processing (sample collection, necessary manipulations e.g. spinning for separation, aliquoting if necessary, storage, retrieval, pipetting, aspiration, etc.). Analytes are generally tested in high-throughput autoanalyzers, and the results are verified and automatically returned to ordering service providers and end-users. These are made possible through the use of an advanced laboratory informatics system that interfaces with multiple computer terminals with end-users, central servers, the physical autoanalyzer instruments, and other automata.

== Etymology ==
According to Etymology Online, the verb assay means "to try, endeavor, strive, test the quality of"; from Anglo-French assaier, from assai (noun), from Old French essai, "trial". Thus the noun assay means "trial, test of quality, test of character" (from mid-14th century), from Anglo-French assai; and its meaning "analysis" is from the late 14th century.

For assay of currency coins this literally meant analysis of the purity of the gold or silver (or whatever the precious component) that represented the true value of the coin. This might have translated later (possibly after the 14th century) into a broader usage of "analysis", e.g., in pharmacology, analysis for an important component of a target inside a mixture—such as the active ingredient of a drug inside the inert excipients in a formulation that previously was measured only grossly by its observable action on an organism (e.g., a lethal dose or inhibitory dose).

== General steps ==
An assay (analysis) is never an isolated process, as it must be accompanied with pre- and post-analytic procedures. Both the communication order (the request to perform an assay plus related information) and the handling of the specimen itself (the collecting, documenting, transporting, and processing done before beginning the assay) are pre-analytic steps. Similarly, after the assay is completed the results must be documented, verified and communicated—the post-analytic steps. As with any multi-step information handling and transmission system, the variation and errors in reporting final results entail not only those intrinsic to the assay itself but also those occurring in the pre-analytic and post-analytic procedures.

While the analytic steps of the assay itself get much attention, it is those that get less attention of the chain of users—the pre-analytic and post-analytic procedures—that typically accumulate the most errors; e.g., pre-analytic steps in medical laboratory assays may contribute 32–75% of all lab errors.

Assays can be very diverse, but generally involve the following general steps:

1. Sample processing and manipulation in order to selectively present the target in a discernible or measurable form to a discrimination/identification/detection system. It might involve a simple centrifugal separation or washing or filtration or capture by some form of selective binding or it may even involve modifying the target e.g. epitope retrieval in immunological assays or cutting down the target into pieces e.g. in Mass Spectrometry. Generally there are multiple separate steps done before an assay and are called preanalytic processing. But some of the manipulations may be inseparable part of the assay itself and will not thus be considered pre-analytic.
2. Target-specific discrimination/identification principle: to discriminate from background (noise) of similar components and specifically identify a particular target component ("analyte") in a biological material by its specific attributes. (e.g. in a PCR assay a specific oligonucleotide primer identifies the target by base pairing based on the specific nucleotide sequence unique to the target).
3. Signal (or target) amplification system: The presence and quantity of that analyte is converted into a detectable signal generally involving some method of signal amplification, so that it can be easily discriminated from noise and measured - e.g. in a PCR assay among a mixture of DNA sequences only the specific target is amplified into millions of copies by a DNA polymerase enzyme so that it can be discerned as a more prominent component compared to any other potential components. Sometimes the concentration of the analyte is too large and in that case the assay may involve sample dilution or some sort of signal diminution system which is a negative amplification.
4. Signal detection (and interpretation) system: A system of deciphering the amplified signal into an interpretable output that can be quantitative or qualitative. It can be visual or manual very crude methods or can be very sophisticated electronic digital or analog detectors.
5. Signal enhancement and noise filtering may be done at any or all of the steps above. Since the more downstream a step/process during an assay, the higher the chance of carrying over noise from the previous process and amplifying it, multiple steps in a sophisticated assay might involve various means of signal-specific sharpening/enhancement arrangements and noise reduction or filtering arrangements. These may simply be in the form of a narrow band-pass optical filter, or a blocking reagent in a binding reaction that prevents nonspecific binding or a quenching reagent in a fluorescence detection system that prevents "autofluorescence" of background objects.

== Assay types based on the nature of the assay process ==
=== Time and number of measurements taken ===
Depending on whether an assay just looks at a single time point or timed readings taken at multiple time points, an assay may be:

1. An end point assay, in which a single measurement is performed after a fixed incubation period; or
2. A kinetic assay, in which measurements are performed multiple times over a fixed time interval. Kinetic assay results may be visualized numerically (for example, as a slope parameter representing the rate of signal change over time), or graphically (for example, as a plot of the signal measured at each time point). For kinetic assays, both the magnitude and shape of the measured response over time provide important information.
3. A high throughput assay can be either an endpoint or a kinetic assay usually done on an automated platform in 96-, 384- or 1536-well microplate formats (High Throughput Screening). Such assays are able to test large number of compounds or analytes or make functional biological readouts in response to a stimuli and/or compounds being tested.

=== Number of analytes detected ===
Depending on how many targets or analytes are being measured:

1. Usual assays are simple or single target assays which is usually the default unless it is called multiplex.
2. Multiplex assays are used to simultaneously measure the presence, concentration, activity, or quality of multiple analytes in a single test. The advent of multiplexing enabled rapid, efficient sample testing in many fields, including immunology, cytochemistry, genetics/genomics, pharmacokinetics, and toxicology.

=== Result type ===
Depending on the quality of the result produced, assays may be classified into:

1. Qualitative assays, i.e. assays which generally give just a pass or fail, or positive or negative or some such sort of only small number of qualitative gradation rather than an exact quantity.
2. Semi-quantitative assays, i.e. assays that give the read-out in an approximate fashion rather than an exact number for the quantity of the substance. Generally they have a few more gradations than just two outcomes, positive or negative, e.g. scoring on a scale of 1+ to 4+ as used for blood grouping tests based on RBC agglutination in response to grouping reagents (antibody against blood group antigens).
3. Quantitative assays, i.e. assays that give accurate and exact numeric quantitative measure of the amount of a substance in a sample. An example of such an assay used in coagulation testing laboratories for the most common inherited bleeding disease - Von Willebrand disease is VWF antigen assay where the amount of VWF present in a blood sample is measured by an immunoassay.
4. Functional assays, i.e. an assay that tries to quantify functioning of an active substance rather than just its quantity. The functional counterpart of the VWF antigen assay is Ristocetin Cofactor assay, which measures the functional activity of the VWF present in a patient's plasma by adding exogenous formalin-fixed platelets and gradually increasing quantities of drug named ristocetin while measuring agglutination of the fixed platelets. A similar assay but used for a different purpose is called Ristocetin Induced Platelet Aggregation or RIPA, which tests response of endogenous live platelets from a patient in response to Ristocetin (exogenous) & VWF (usually endogenous).

=== Sample type and method ===
Depending on the general substrate on which the assay principle is applied:

1. Bioassay: when the response is biological activity of live objects. Examples include
  1. in vivo, whole organism (e.g. mouse or other subject injected with a drug)
  2. ex vivo body part (e.g. leg of a frog)
  3. ex vivo organ (e.g. heart of a dog)
  4. ex vivo part of an organ (e.g. a segment of an intestine).
  5. tissue (e.g. limulus lysate)
  6. cell (e.g. platelets)
2. Ligand binding assay when a ligand (usually a small molecule) binds a receptor (usually a large protein).
3. Immunoassay when the response is an antigen antibody binding type reaction.

=== Signal amplification ===
Depending on the nature of the signal amplification system assays may be of numerous types, to name a few:

1. Enzyme assay: Enzymes may be tested by their highly repeating activity on a large number of substrates when loss of a substrate or the making of a product may have a measurable attribute like color or absorbance at a particular wavelength or light or Electrochemiluminescence or electrical/redox activity.
2. Light detection systems that may use amplification e.g. by a photodiode or a photomultiplier tube or a cooled charge-coupled device.
3. Radioisotope labeled substrates as used in radioimmunoassays and equilibrium dialysis assays and can be detected by the amplification in Gamma counters or X-ray plates, or phosphorimager
4. Polymerase Chain Reaction Assays that amplify a DNA (or RNA) target rather than the signal
5. Combination Methods Assays may utilize a combination of the above and other amplification methods to improve sensitivity. e.g. Enzyme-linked immunoassay or EIA, enzyme linked immunosorbent assay.

=== Detection method or technology ===
Depending on the nature of the Detection system assays can be based on:

1. Colony forming or virtual colony count: e.g. by multiplying bacteria or proliferating cells.
2. Photometry / spectrophotometry When the absorbance of a specific wavelength of light while passing through a fixed path-length through a cuvette of liquid test sample is measured and the absorbance is compared with a blank and standards with graded amounts of the target compound. If the emitted light is of a specific visible wavelength it may be called colorimetry, or it may involve specific wavelength of light e.g. by use of laser and emission of fluorescent signals of another specific wavelength which is detected via very specific wavelength optical filters.
3. Transmittance of light may be used to measure e.g. clearing of opacity of a liquid created by suspended particles due to decrease in number of clumps during a platelet agglutination reaction.
4. Turbidimetry when the opacity of straight-transmitted light passing through a liquid sample is measured by detectors placed straight across the light source.
5. Nephelometry where a measurement of the amount of light scattering that occurs when a beam of light is passed through the solution is used to determine size and/or concentration and/or size distribution of particles in the sample.
6. Reflectometry When color of light reflected from a (usually dry) sample or reactant is assessed e.g. the automated readings of the strip urine dipstick assays.
7. Viscoelastic measurements e.g. viscometry, elastography (e.g. thromboelastography)
8. Counting assays: e.g. optic Flow cytometric cell or particle counters, or coulter/impedance principle based cell counters
9. Imaging assays, that involve image analysis manually or by software:
  1. Cytometry: When the size statistics of cells is assessed by an image processor.
10. Electric detection e.g. involving amperometry, Voltammetry, coulometry may be used directly or indirectly for many types of quantitative measurements.
11. Other physical property based assays may use
  1. Osmometer
  2. Viscometer
  3. Ion Selective electrodes
  4. Syndromic testing

== Assay types based on the targets being measured ==
=== DNA ===
Assays for studying interactions of proteins with DNA include:

- ATAC-seq
- Chromatin immunoprecipitation
  - ChIP-exo
  - ChIP-on-chip
  - ChIP-seq
  - CUT&RUN
  - CUT&TAG
- Chromosome conformation capture
  - ChIA-PET (also chromatin immunoprecipitation)
  - HiChIP (also chromatin immunoprecipitation)
  - Hi-C
- DamID
- DNase footprinting assay
- DNase-seq
- FAIRE-seq
- Filter binding assay
- Gel shift assay
- MNase-seq

=== Protein ===
- Bicinchoninic acid assay (BCA assay)
- Bradford protein assay
- Lowry protein assay
- Secretion assay

=== RNA ===
- Immunoprecipitation
  - CLIP-seq
  - RIP-ChIP
- Nuclear run-on (GRO-seq/cap, PRO-seq/cap, CoPRO, ChRO-seq)
- Ribosome profiling (Ribo-seq)

=== Cell counting, viability, proliferation or cytotoxicity assays ===
A cell-counting assay may determine the number of living cells, the number of dead cells, or the ratio of one cell type to another, such as enumerating and typing red versus different types of white blood cells. This is measured by different physical methods (light transmission, electric current change). But other methods use biochemical probing cell structure or physiology (stains). Another application is to monitor cell culture (assays of cell proliferation or cytotoxicity). A cytotoxicity assay measures how toxic a chemical compound is to cells.

- MTT assay
- Cell Counting Kit-8 (WST-8 based cell viability assay)
- SRB (Sulforhodamine B) assay
- CellTiter-Glo® Luminescent Cell Viability Assay
- Cell counting instruments and methods: CASY cell counting technology, Coulter counter, Electric cell-substrate impedance sensing
- Cell viability assays: resazurin method, ATP test, Ethidium homodimer assay (detect dead or dying cells), Bacteriological water analysis, Clonogenic assays, ...

=== Environmental or food contaminants ===
- Bisphenol F
- Aquatic toxicity tests

=== Surfactants ===
- An MBAS assay indicates anionic surfactants in water with a bluing reaction.

=== Other cell assays ===
Many cell assays have been developed to assess specific parameters or response of cells (biomarkers, cell physiology). Techniques used to study cells include :

- reporter assays using i.e. Luciferase, calcium signaling assays using Coelenterazine, CFSE or Calcein
- Immunostaining of cells on slides by Microscopy (ImmunoHistoChemistry or Fluorescence), on microplates by photometry including the ELISpot (and its variant FluoroSpot) to enumerate B-Cells or antigen-specific cells, in solution by Flow cytometry
- Molecular biology techniques such as DNA microarrays, in situ hybridization, combined to PCR, Computational genomics, and Transfection; Cell fractionation or Immunoprecipitation
- Migration assays, Chemotaxis assay
- Secretion assays
- Apoptosis assays such as the DNA laddering assay, the Nicoletti assay, caspase activity assays, and Annexin V staining
- Chemosensitivity assay measures the number of tumor cells that are killed by a cancer drug
- Tetramer assay detect the presence of antigen specific T-cells
- Gentamicin protection assay or survival assay or invasion assay to assess ability of pathogens (bacteria) to invade eukaryotic cells
- Metastasis Assay
- Enhancer-FACS-seq, the technique using a cell sorting process before DNA sequencing

=== Petrochemistry ===
- Crude oil assay

=== Virology ===
The HPCE-based viral titer assay uses a proprietary, high-performance capillary electrophoresis system to determine baculovirus titer.

The Trofile assay is used to determine HIV tropism.

The viral plaque assay is to calculate the number of viruses present in a sample. In this technique the number of viral plaques formed by a viral inoculum is counted, from which the actual virus concentration can be determined.

=== Cellular secretions ===
A wide range of cellular secretions (say, a specific antibody or cytokine) can be detected using the ELISA technique. The number of cells which secrete those particular substances can be determined using a related technique, the ELISPOT assay.

=== Drugs ===
- Testing for Illegal Drugs
- Radioligand binding assay

== Quality ==
When multiple assays measure the same target their results and utility may or may not be comparable depending on the natures of the assay and their methodology, reliability etc. Such comparisons are possible through study of general quality attributes of the assays e.g. principles of measurement (including identification, amplification and detection), dynamic range of detection (usually the range of linearity of the standard curve), analytic sensitivity, functional sensitivity, analytic specificity, positive, negative predictive values, turn around time i.e. time taken to finish a whole cycle from the preanalytic steps till the end of the last post analytic step (report dispatch/transmission), throughput i.e. number of assays done per unit time (usually expressed as per hour) etc. Organizations or laboratories that perform Assays for professional purposes e.g. medical diagnosis and prognostics, environmental analysis, forensic proceeding, pharmaceutical research and development must undergo well regulated quality assurance procedures including method validation, regular calibration, analytical quality control, proficiency testing, test accreditation, test licensing and must document appropriate certifications from the relevant regulating bodies in order to establish the reliability of their assays, especially to remain legally acceptable and accountable for the quality of the assay results and also to convince customers to use their assay commercially/professionally.

== List of BioAssay databases ==
=== Bioactivity databases ===
Bioactivity databases correlate structures or other chemical information to bioactivity results taken from bioassays in literature, patents, and screening programs.

Name	Developer(s)	Initial release
ScrubChem	Jason Bret Harris	2016
PubChem-BioAssay	NIH	2004
ChEMBL	EMBL-EBI	2009

=== Protocol databases ===
Protocol databases correlate results from bioassays to their metadata about experimental conditions and protocol designs.

Name	Developer(s)	Initial release
BioMetaData or BioAssay Express	Collaborative Drug Discovery	2016
PubChem-BioAssay	NIH	2004

== See also ==
- Analytical chemistry
- MELISA
- Multiplex (assay)
- Pharmaceutical chemistry
- Titration
