= INT (chemical) =

Names
- IUPAC name 3-(4-Iodophenyl)-2-(4-nitrophenyl)-5-phenyl-2H-tetrazol-3-ium chloride
- Other names 2-(4-Iodophenyl)-3-(4-nitrophenyl)-5-phenyltetrazolium chloride

Identifiers
CAS Number	146-68-9
3D model (JSmol)	Interactive image
ChemSpider	58482
ECHA InfoCard	100.005.161
PubChem CID	629284
UNII	XY3JA5594E
CompTox Dashboard (EPA)	DTXSID30932744
- InChI: InChI=1S/C19H13IN5O2.ClH/c20-15-6-8-16(9-7-15)23-21-19(14-4-2-1-3-5-14)22-24(23)17-10-12-18(13-11-17)25(26)27;/h1-13H;1H/q+1;/p-1 Key: JORABGDXCIBAFL-UHFFFAOYSA-M
- SMILES: [Cl-].[O-][N+](=O)c1ccc(cc1)n3nc(n[n+]3c2ccc(I)cc2)c4ccccc4

Properties
Chemical formula	C_{19}H_{13}ClIN_{5}O_{2}
Molar mass	505.70 g·mol^{−1}
Melting point	240 °C (464 °F; 513 K) (decomposes)
Solubility in methanol: water (1:1)	50 mg/mL hot, very faintly turbid, very deep yellow
log P	−2.4
- Except where otherwise noted, data are given for materials in their standard state (at 25 °C [77 °F], 100 kPa). Infobox references

INT (iodonitrotetrazolium or 2-(4-iodophenyl)-3-(4-nitrophenyl)-5-phenyl-2H-tetrazolium) is a commonly used tetrazolium salt (usually prepared with chloride ions), similar to tetrazolium chloride that on reduction produces a red formazan dye that can be used for quantitative redox assays. It is also toxic to prokaryotes.

INT is an artificial electron acceptor that can be utilized in a colorimetric assay to determine the concentration of protein in a solution. It can be reduced by succinate dehydrogenase to furazan, the formation of which can be measured by absorbance at 490 nm. The activity of succinate dehydrogenase is readily observed by the naked eye as the solution turns from colorless to rusty red.

== See also ==
- MTT assay
