= Lymphocyte =

Subtype of white blood cell

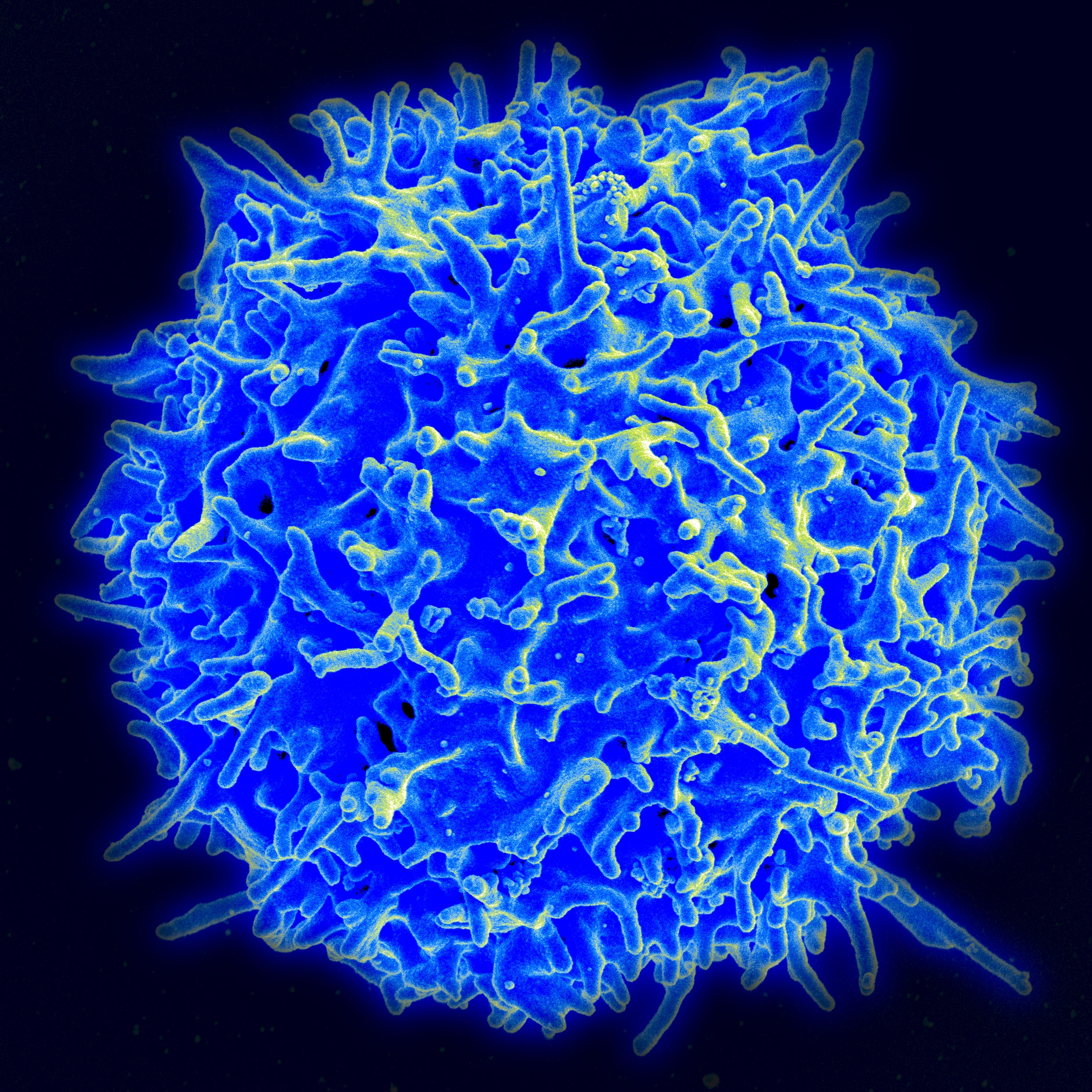
- Scanning electron micrograph of a human T cell

Details
- System: Immune system
- Function: White blood cell

Identifiers
- MeSH: D008214
- TH: H2.00.04.1.02002
- FMA: 84065 62863, 84065

A lymphocyte is a type of white blood cell (leukocyte) in the immune system of most vertebrates. Lymphocytes include T cells (for cell-mediated and cytotoxic adaptive immunity), B cells (for humoral, antibody-driven adaptive immunity), and innate lymphoid cells (ILCs; "innate T cell-like" cells involved in mucosal immunity and homeostasis), of which natural killer cells are an important subtype (which functions in cell-mediated, cytotoxic innate immunity). They are the main type of cell found in lymph, which prompted the name "lymphocyte" (with cyte meaning cell). Lymphocytes make up between 18% and 42% of circulating white blood cells.

== Types ==
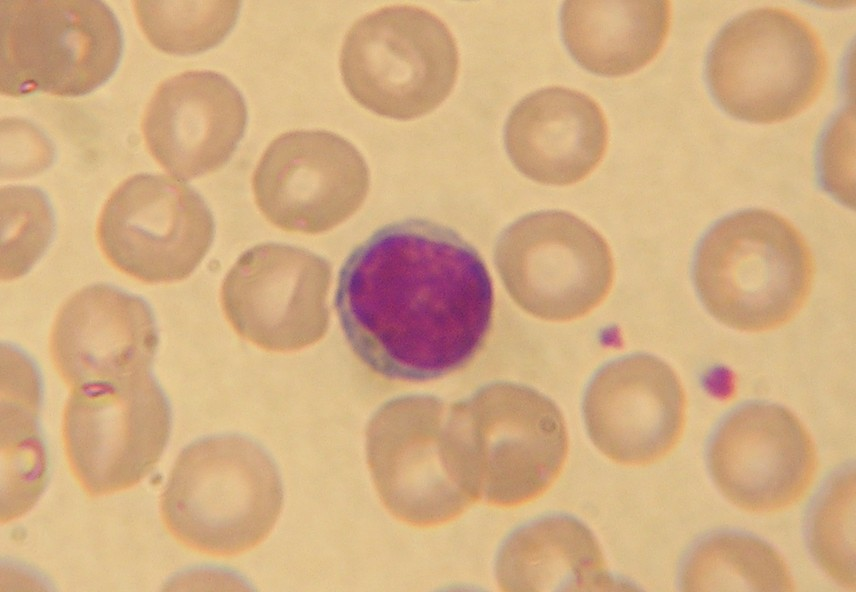
A stained lymphocyte surrounded by red blood cells viewed using a light microscope

4D live imaging of T cell nuclear dynamics viewed using holotomography microscopy

The three major types of lymphocyte are T cells, B cells and natural killer (NK) cells.

They can also be classified as small lymphocytes and large lymphocytes based on their size and appearance.

Lymphocytes can be identified by their large nucleus.

=== T cells and B cells ===
T cells (thymus cells) and B cells (bone marrow- or bursa-derived cells (Note: The process of B-cell maturation was elucidated in birds and the B most likely means "bursa-derived" referring to the bursa of Fabricius. However, in humans (who do not have that organ), the bone marrow makes B cells, and the B can serve as a reminder of bone marrow.)) are the major cellular components of the adaptive immune response. T cells are involved in cell-mediated immunity, whereas B cells are primarily responsible for humoral immunity (relating to antibodies). The function of T cells and B cells is to recognize specific "non-self" antigens, during a process known as antigen presentation. Once they have identified an invader, the cells generate specific responses that are tailored maximally to eliminate specific pathogens or pathogen-infected cells. B cells respond to pathogens by producing large quantities of antibodies which then neutralize foreign objects like bacteria and viruses. In response to pathogens some T cells, called T helper cells, produce cytokines that direct the immune response, while other T cells, called cytotoxic T cells, produce toxic granules that contain powerful enzymes which induce the death of pathogen-infected cells. Following activation, B cells and T cells leave a lasting legacy of the antigens they have encountered, in the form of memory cells. Throughout the lifetime of an animal, these memory cells will "remember" each specific pathogen encountered, and are able to mount a strong and rapid response if the same pathogen is detected again; this is known as acquired immunity.

=== Natural killer cells ===
NK cells are a part of the innate immune system and play a major role in defending the host from tumors and virally infected cells. NK cells modulate the functions of other cells, including macrophages and T cells, and distinguish infected cells and tumors from normal and uninfected cells by recognizing changes of a surface molecule called major histocompatibility complex (MHC) class I. NK cells are activated in response to a family of cytokines called interferons. Activated NK cells release cytotoxic (cell-killing) granules which then destroy the altered cells. They are named "natural killer cells" because they do not require prior activation in order to kill cells which are missing MHC class I.

=== Dual expresser lymphocyte – X cell ===
The X lymphocyte is a reported cell type expressing both a B-cell receptor and T-cell receptor and is hypothesized to be implicated in type 1 diabetes. Its existence as a cell type has been challenged by two studies. However, the authors of the original article pointed to the fact that the two studies have detected X cells by imaging microscopy and FACS as described. Additional studies are required to determine the nature and properties of X cells (also called dual expressers).

== Development ==
Development of blood cells

Mammalian stem cells differentiate into several kinds of blood cell within the bone marrow. This process is called haematopoiesis. All lymphocytes originate, during this process, from a common lymphoid progenitor before differentiating into their distinct lymphocyte types. The differentiation of lymphocytes follows various pathways in a hierarchical fashion as well as in a more plastic fashion. The formation of lymphocytes is known as lymphopoiesis. In mammals, B cells mature in the bone marrow, which is at the core of most bones. In birds, B cells mature in the bursa of Fabricius, a lymphoid organ where they were first discovered by Chang and Glick, (B for bursa) and not from bone marrow as commonly believed. T cells migrate to the blood stream and mature in a distinct primary organ, called the thymus. Following maturation, the lymphocytes enter the circulation and peripheral lymphoid organs (e.g. the spleen and lymph nodes) where they survey for invading pathogens and/or tumor cells.

The lymphocytes involved in adaptive immunity (i.e. B and T cells) differentiate further after exposure to an antigen; they form effector and memory lymphocytes. Effector lymphocytes function to eliminate the antigen, either by releasing antibodies (in the case of B cells), cytotoxic granules (cytotoxic T cells) or by signaling to other cells of the immune system (helper T cells). Memory T cells remain in the peripheral tissues and circulation for an extended time ready to respond to the same antigen upon future exposure; they live weeks to several years, which is very long compared to other leukocytes.

== Characteristics ==
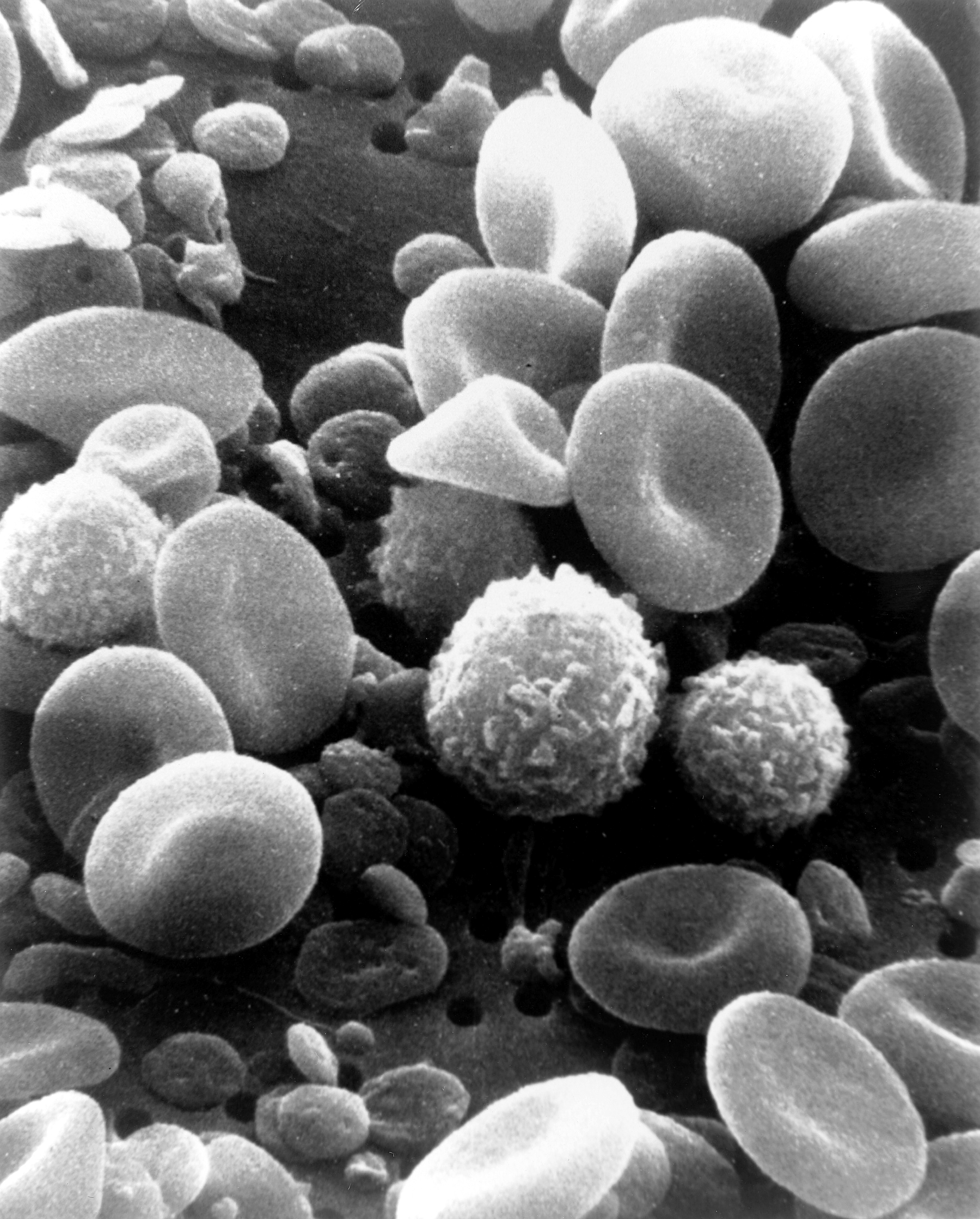
A scanning electron microscope image of normal circulating human blood showing red blood cells, several types of white blood cells including lymphocytes, a monocyte, a neutrophil and many small disc-shaped platelets

Microscopically, in a Wright's stained peripheral blood smear, a normal lymphocyte has a large, dark-staining nucleus with little to no eosinophilic cytoplasm. In normal situations, the coarse, dense nucleus of a lymphocyte is approximately the size of a red blood cell (about 7 μm in diameter). Some lymphocytes show a clear perinuclear zone (or halo) around the nucleus or could exhibit a small clear zone to one side of the nucleus. Polyribosomes are a prominent feature in the lymphocytes and can be viewed with an electron microscope. The ribosomes are involved in protein synthesis, allowing the generation of large quantities of cytokines and immunoglobulins by these cells.

It is impossible to distinguish between T cells and B cells in a peripheral blood smear. Normally, flow cytometry testing is used for specific lymphocyte population counts. This can be used to determine the percentage of lymphocytes that contain a particular combination of specific cell surface proteins, such as immunoglobulins or cluster of differentiation (CD) markers or that produce particular proteins (for example, cytokines using intracellular cytokine staining (ICCS)). In order to study the function of a lymphocyte by virtue of the proteins it generates, other scientific techniques like the ELISPOT or secretion assay techniques can be used.

Typical recognition markers for lymphocytes
Class	Function	Proportion (median, 95% CI)	Phenotypic marker(s)
Natural killer cells	Lysis of virally infected cells and tumour cells	7% (2–13%)	CD16 CD56 but not CD3
T helper cells	Release cytokines and growth factors that regulate other immune cells	46% (28–59%)	TCRαβ, CD3 and CD4
Cytotoxic T cells	Lysis of virally infected cells, tumour cells and allografts	19% (13–32%)	TCRαβ, CD3 and CD8
Gamma delta T cells	Immunoregulation and cytotoxicity	5% (2–8%)	TCRγδ and CD3
B cells	Secretion of antibodies	23% (18–47%)	MHC class II, CD19 and CD20

In the circulatory system, they move from lymph node to lymph node. This contrasts with macrophages, which are rather stationary in the nodes.

== Lymphocytes and disease ==
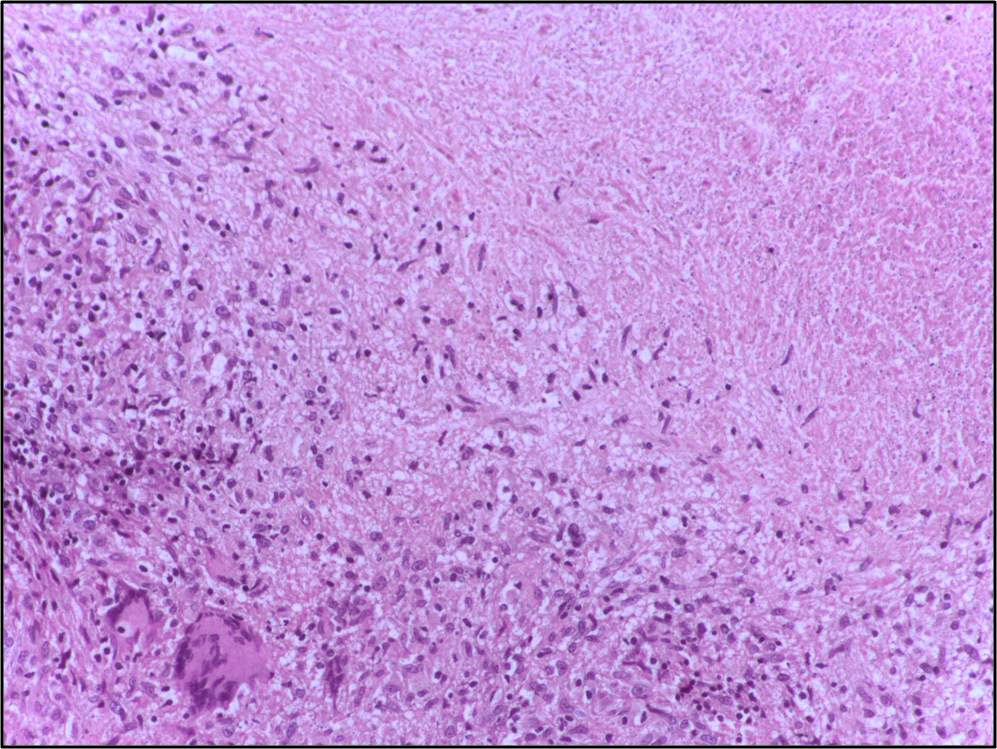
Several lymphocytes seen collected around a tuberculous granuloma

A lymphocyte count is usually part of a peripheral complete blood cell count and is expressed as the percentage of lymphocytes to the total number of white blood cells counted.

A general increase in the number of lymphocytes is known as lymphocytosis, whereas a decrease is known as lymphocytopenia.

=== High ===
An increase in lymphocyte concentration is usually a sign of a viral infection (in some rare cases, leukemias are found through an abnormally raised lymphocyte count in an otherwise normal person). A high lymphocyte count with a low neutrophil count might be caused by lymphoma. Pertussis toxin (PTx) of Bordetella pertussis, formerly known as lymphocytosis-promoting factor, causes a decrease in the entry of lymphocytes into lymph nodes, which can lead to a condition known as lymphocytosis, with a complete lymphocyte count of over 4000 per μl in adults or over 8000 per μl in children. This is unique in that many bacterial infections illustrate neutrophil-predominance instead.

==== Lymphoproliferative disorders ====
Lymphoproliferative disorders (LPD) encompass a diverse group of diseases marked by uncontrolled lymphocyte production, leading to issues like lymphocytosis, lymphadenopathy, and bone marrow infiltration. These disorders are common in immunocompromised individuals and involve abnormal proliferation of T and B cells, often resulting in immunodeficiency and immune system dysfunction. Various gene mutations, both iatrogenic and acquired, are implicated in LPD. One subtype, X-linked LPD, is linked to mutations in the X chromosome, predisposing individuals to natural killer cell LPD and T-cell LPD. Additionally, conditions like common variable immunodeficiency (CVID), severe combined immunodeficiency (SCID), and certain viral infections elevate the risk of LPD. Treatment methods, such as immunosuppressive drugs and tissue transplantation, can also increase susceptibility. LPDs encompass a wide array of disorders involving B-cell (e.g., chronic lymphocytic leukemia) and T-cell (e.g., Sezary syndrome) abnormalities, each presenting distinct challenges in diagnosis and management.

=== Low ===
A low normal to low absolute lymphocyte concentration is associated with increased rates of infection after surgery or trauma.

One basis for low T cell lymphocytes occurs when the human immunodeficiency virus (HIV) infects and destroys T cells (specifically, the CD4^{+} subgroup of T lymphocytes, which become helper T cells). Without the key defense that these T cells provide, the body becomes susceptible to opportunistic infections that otherwise would not affect healthy people. The extent of HIV progression is typically determined by measuring the percentage of CD4^{+} T cells in the patient's blood – HIV ultimately progresses to acquired immune deficiency syndrome (AIDS). The effects of other viruses or lymphocyte disorders can also often be estimated by counting the numbers of lymphocytes present in the blood.

=== Tumor-infiltrating lymphocytes ===
In some cancers, such as melanoma and colorectal cancer, lymphocytes can migrate into and attack the tumor. This can sometimes lead to regression of the primary tumor.

== Blood content ==
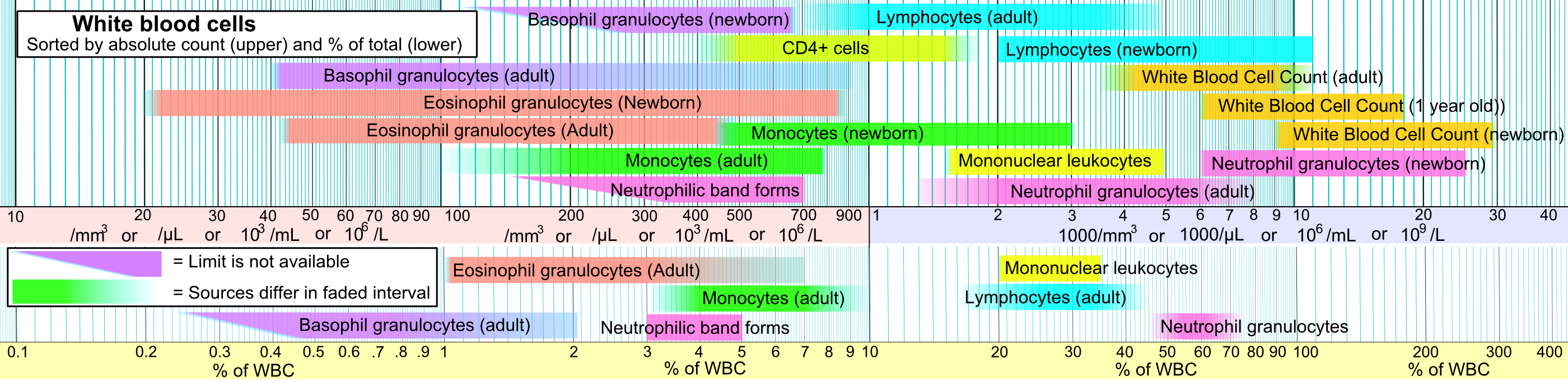
Reference ranges for blood tests of white blood cells, comparing lymphocyte amount (shown in light blue) with other cells

== See also ==
- Addressin
- Anergy
- Complete blood count
- Cytotoxicity
- Human leukocyte antigen
- Lymphocystivirus
- Lymphoproliferative disorders
- Myeloid tissue
- Reactive lymphocyte
- Secretion assay
- Trogocytosis
