= E-SCREEN =

E-SCREEN is a cell proliferation assay based on the enhanced proliferation of human breast cancer cells (MCF-7) in the presence of estrogen active substances. The E-SCREEN test is a tool to easily and rapidly assess estrogenic activity of suspected xenoestrogens (singly or in combination). This bioassay measures estrogen-induced increase of the number of human breast cancer cell, which is biologically equivalent to the increase of mitotic activity in tissues of the genital tract. It was originally developed by Soto et al. and was included in the first version of the OECD Conceptual Framework for Testing and Assessment of Endocrine Disrupters published in 2012. However, due to failed validation, it was not included in the updated version of the framework published in 2018.

== The E-SCREEN test ==
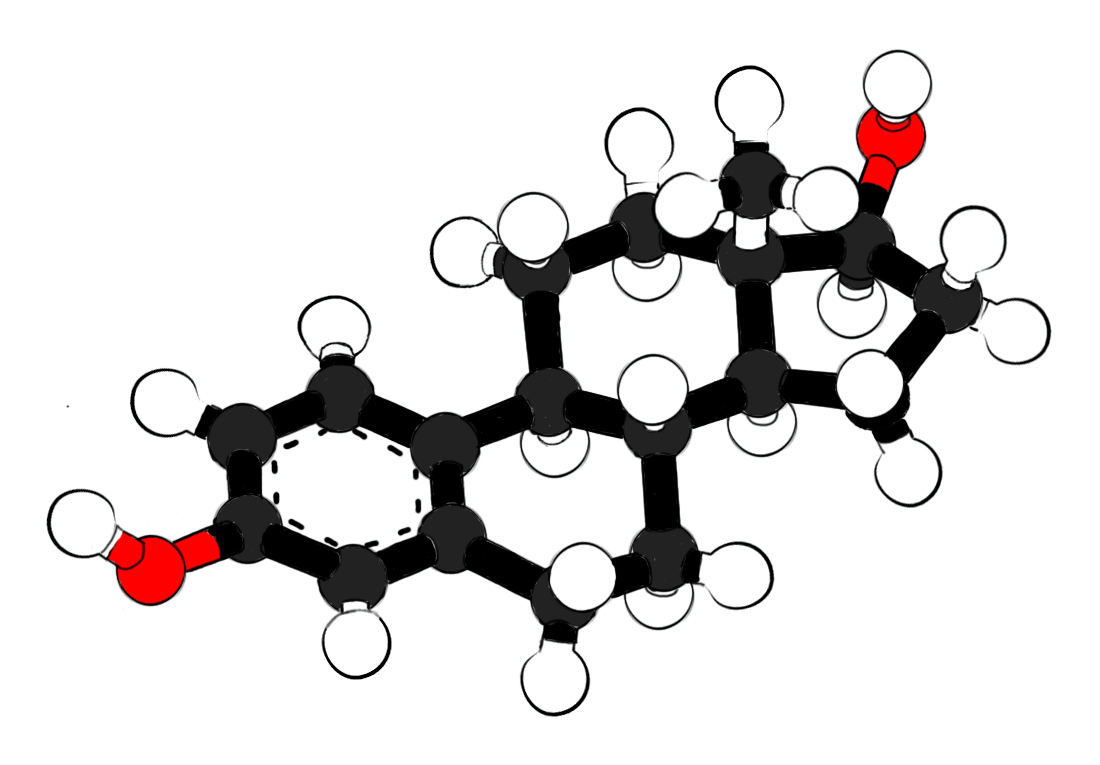
17β-estradiol (estrogen)

The E-SCREEN cell proliferation assay is performed with the human MCF-7 breast cancer cell line, an established estrogenic cell line that endogenously expresses ERα.

Human MCF-7 are cultivated in Dulbecco's modified Eagle's medium (DMEM) with fetal bovine serum (FBS) and phenol red as buffer tracer (culture medium), at 37 °C, in an atmosphere of 5% CO_{2} and 95% air under saturating humidity. To accomplish the E-SCREEN assay the cells are trypsinized and plated in well culture plates. Cells are allowed to attach for 24 h, and the 4 seeding medium is then removed and replaced with the experimental culture medium (phenol red free DMEM with charcoal dextran treated fetal bovine serum -steroid-free-).

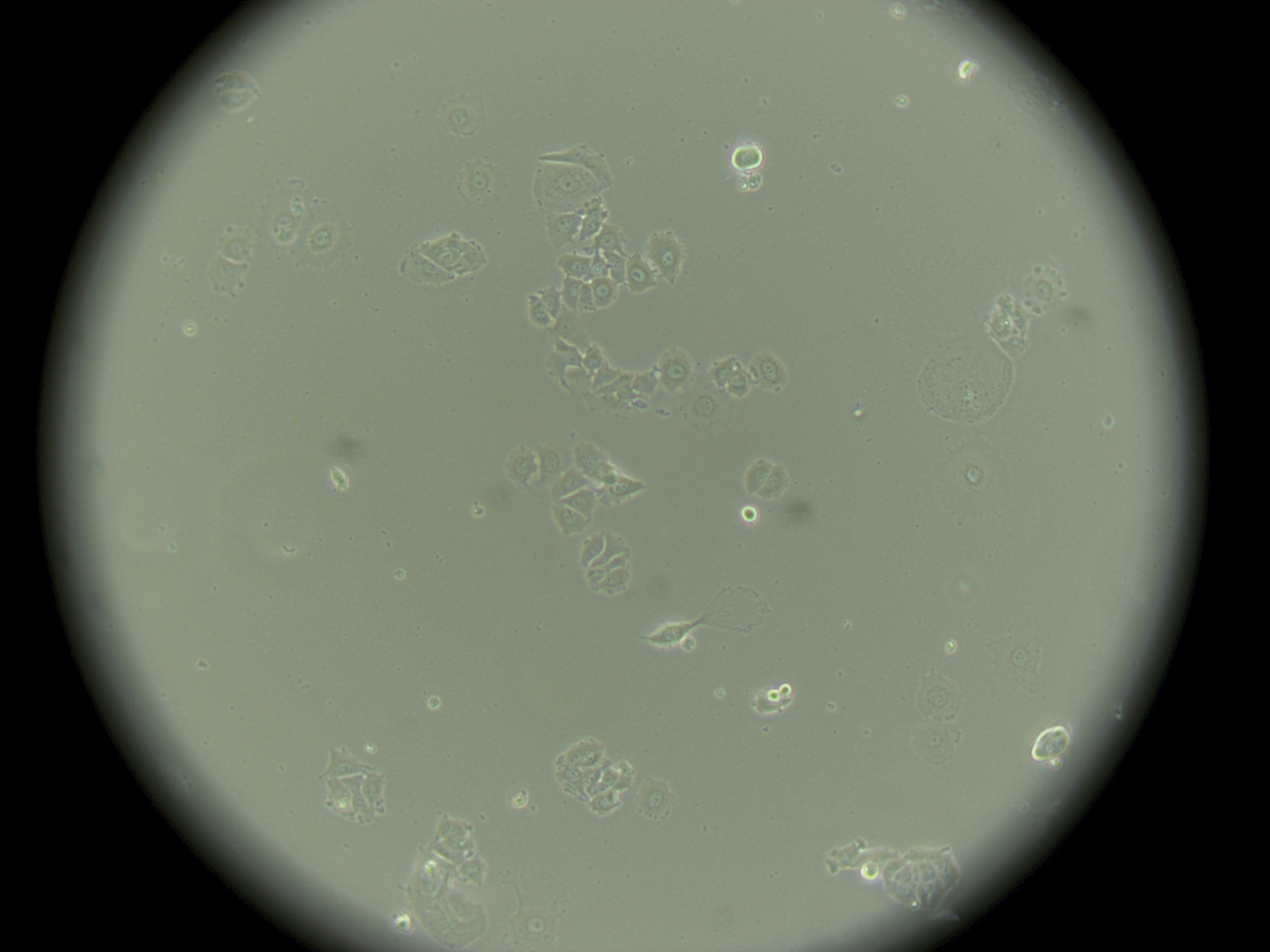
MCF-7 cell.

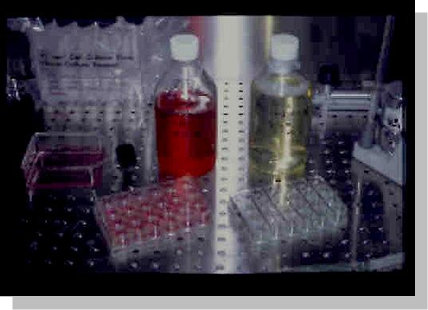
A tissue culture hood

For assaying suspected estrogen active substances, a range of concentrations of the test compound is added to the experimental medium. In each experiment, the cells are exposed to a dilution series of 17β-estradiol (0.1 pM–1000 pM) for providing a positive control (standard dose-response curve), and treated only with hormone-free medium as a negative control. The bioassay ends on day 6 (late exponential phase) by removing the media from the wells and fixing the cells with trichloroacetic acid. After incubation (30 min; 4 °C) the trichloroacetic acid is removed by washing the plates under a gentle stream of cold water. After drying the plates at 40 °C the cell protein is stained with sulforhodamine B (SRB). After incubation (10 min) the dye is washed off with aqueous acetic acid (1%) and the plates are dried again at 40 °C. Finally, bound dye is solubilized with tris-buffer and incubated (20 min; 4 °C) and the absorbance is read at 492 nm.

The estrogenic activity results are expressed as mean ± standard deviation of the proliferative effect (PE), which represents the maximum proliferation induced by the test compound, and is the ratio between the highest cell number achieved with the sample or 17-β-estradiol and the cell number in the control group:

$\quad PE = {(max \ cell\ number) \ sample \over (cell \ number) \ solvent \ control}$

The estrogenic activity of a sample is evaluated by determining the relative efficacy of stimulation, called the relative proliferative effect (RPE%). The RPE compares the maximum proliferation induced by a sample with that induced by 17-β-estradiol:

$\quad RPE\% = {(PE-1) \ sample \over (PE-1) \ 17 \ Beta \ estradiol} \cdot 100$

The RPE can be used to define full agonists for ER, between 80% and 100% relative proliferation. Partial and weak agonists induce a relative cell proliferation from 25% up to 80%, or 10% to 25%, respectively.

- Shortcomings/Limitations: One of the limitations for determining estrogenicity of chemicals by checking the proliferation of ER positive MCF-7 cell line is that mitogens other than estrogens can also influence cell proliferation thus rendering non-specific responses by chemicals.

The rationality for the use of this cell line is that:

1. It is a cell line of endocrine origin and is ER positive.
2. Expresses aromatase and 5α-reductase like other steroidogenic cells.
3. Possesses endogenous aromatase activity which converts androgens to estrogens.
4. Can elicit an estrogen-induced response involving both genomic and non-genomic pathways.

== Mechanisms of action ==
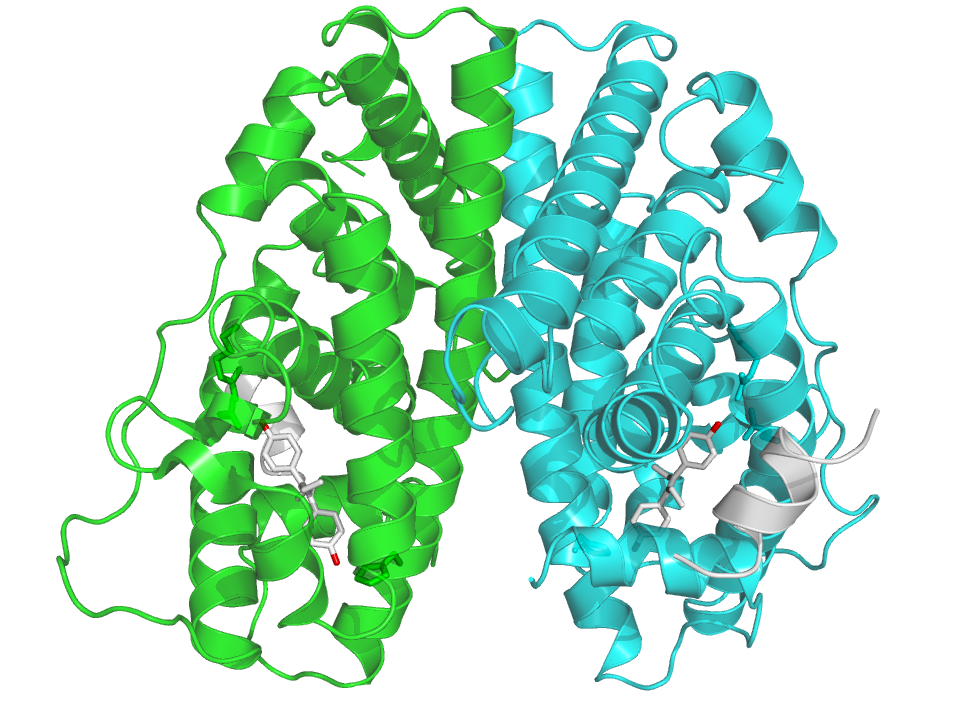
Estrogen receptor 1 (ERα)

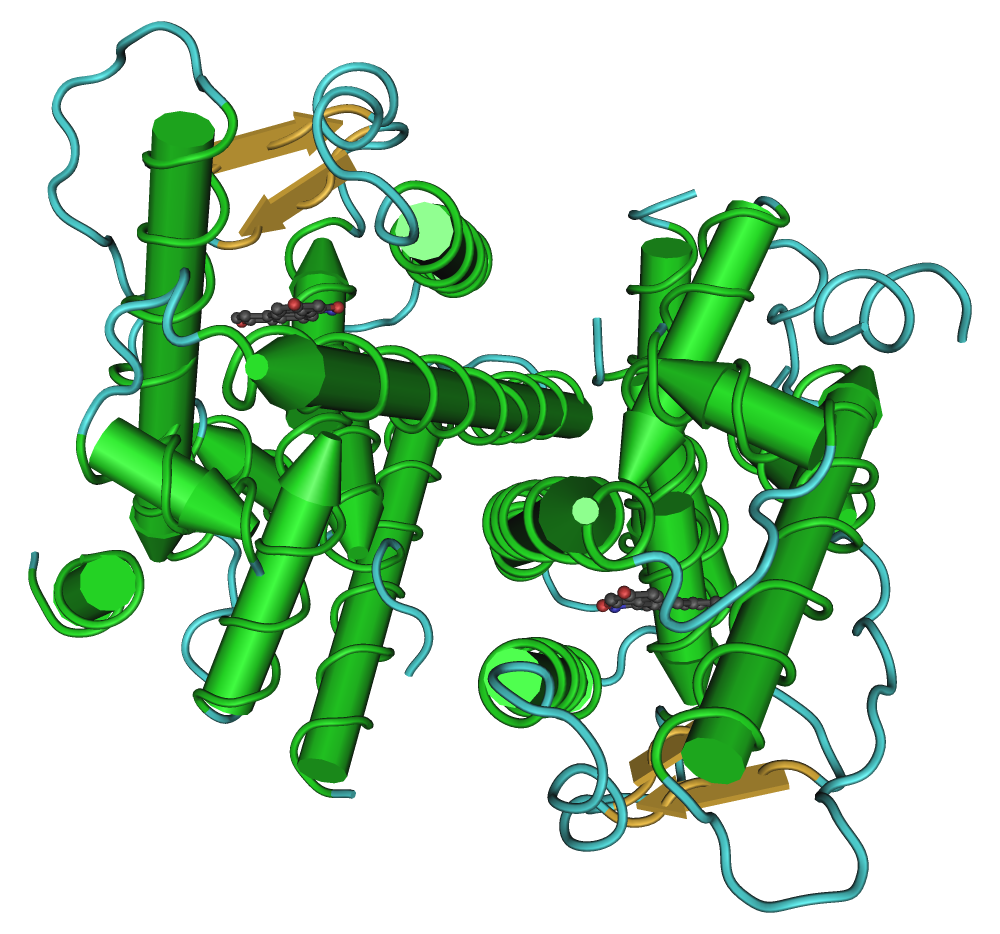
Estrogen receptor 2 (ERβ)

The biological effects of estrogens (and xenoestrogens) are mediated through the estrogen receptor (ER). Estrogen receptors, which belong to a large superfamily of nuclear receptors, are transcription factors that induce transcription of target genes after binding to specific DNA sequences in their promoter.

There are two isoforms (ERα and ERβ):

1. The ERα is present in the uterus, and it is thought to drive the uterotropic response, since the uteri of the ERα "knock-out" mice do not respond to the estrogen administration.
2. The ERβ is present in organs such as prostate, hypothalamic nuclei and pituitary gland. It is also present, together with ERα in some human breast cancer cell lines.

The ER mediates most of the biological effects at the level of gene regulation by interacting through its site-specific DNA and with other coregulatory proteins. The classical mechanism of activation of ERs depends on ligand binding to the nuclear hormone receptors, after which the receptors dimerize and bind to estrogen response elements (EREs) located in the promoters of estrogen-responsive genes.

Nevertheless, basic scientific research shows that estrogens (and xenoestrogens) may also exert actions through nonnuclear steroid hormone receptors (e.g., membrane ERs), nonsteroid receptors (e.g., neurotransmitter receptors such as the serotonin receptor, dopamine receptor, norepinephrine receptor), orphan receptors (e.g., aryl hydrocarbon receptor (AhR)), enzymatic pathways involved in steroid biosynthesis and/or metabolism, and numerous other mechanisms that converge upon endocrine and reproductive systems.

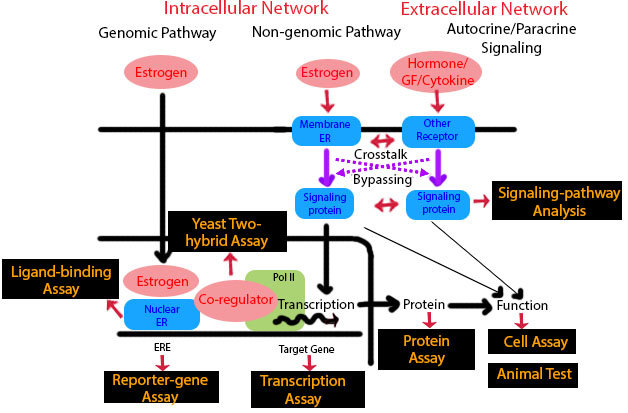
Estrogenic endocrine disruptors: Molecular mechanisms of action Signaling pathways, crosstalk and autocrine/paracrine/homeostatic signaling networks of estrogenic chemicals.

== Human health implications ==
Several reports suggest that xenoestrogens are clinically significant because they can mimic the effects of endogenous estrogen and directly or indirectly have been implicated in precocious puberty and other disorders of the reproductive system in wildlife and humans.

For example, many xenoestrogens are suspected to contribute to the development of breast cancer in women and prostate and testicular cancers in men, to reduce male fertility and to interact with the immune system.

== Other tests to identify estrogens and/or xenoestrogens ==
=== In vivo tests (animal testing) ===
==== Uterotrophic Bioassay in Rodents: OECD Test Guideline 440 ====
The gain of the number of human breast cancer cell is biologically identic to the rise, in tissues of the genital tract, of the mitotic activity such as the rodent endometrium. In the 1930s, a new screening test called the uterotrophic bioassay was created, but it was not until 1962 that was firstly normalized by an expert committee. This assay quantifies the addition of uterine wet weight or the intensification of uterotrophic response and, additionally, it measures vaginal cornification. The test estimates a chemical's ability to evoke biological activities in accord with agonists or antagonists of endogenous estrogens (e.g. 17ß-estradiol); nevertheless, its use for agonists investigation is much more ordinary than for antagonist. The uterus responds to estrogens in two ways:

1. An initial response is an addition of weight owing to water imbibition.
2. This response is succeeded by a weight gain as a result of tissue growth.

The uterus responses in rats and mice can be qualitatively compared.

- Shortcomings/Limitations: The increase of uterine wet weight is not a specific estrogen respond. In addition, this assay has problems inherent to animal testing, is costly and time consuming.

==== Vitellogenin assay ====
Exposure to estrogens (xenoestrogens) may be also easily assessed in fish, reptiles or birds by measuring their vitellogenin (VTG) plasma levels. An example is that expression of the egg yolk precursor protein vitellogenin can be measured by the E-SCREEN test in juvenile brown trout. Usually, vitellogenin is only produced by female fish, because it is estrogen-dependent. Nevertheless, the synthesis of this protein in males and young fish can also occur, as xenoestrogens can also affect the hepatic receptors and activate it. Hence, a frequently used biomarker of exposure to estrogen active substances in the environment is the measurement of vitellogenin levels in male and juvenile trout.

=== In vitro test (quantitative bioassays using cells in culture) ===
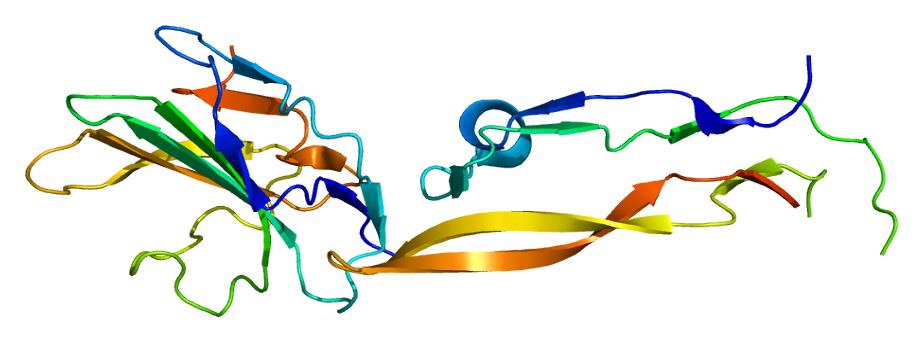
Protein TGF β-3

==== Induction of estrogen-related proteins, such as pS2, prolactine or transforming growth factor β-3 (TGF β-3) ====
In several stable cell lines, it is possible to induce specific estrogen-related proteins. For example, in the human MCF-7 breast cancer cell line the protein pS2 is strongly up-regulated by estrogen. Induction of the pS2 protein can be detected already one hour after estrogen, or a given compound acting as an estrogen, is added to the cells.

==== Induction of reporter genes under control of estrogen-responsible elements ====
It is possible to generate an estrogen-responsive reporter cell line by introducing into a situable cell line specific DNA sequences that induce transcription of target genes of a readily measurable protein (the so-called reporter gene; e.g. firefly luciferase). That is an in vitro reporter gene assays detecting estrogen receptor (ER) activation. These bioassays form a group of the so-called CALUX (Chemically Activated LUciferase eXpression) bioassays. These systems are exemplified by the estrogen receptor ER CALUX bioassay consisting of the human T-47D breast tumor cell line expressing estrogen receptors (ER) endogenously together with an ER-specific Luciferase construct. A version of the ER CALUX bioassay, consisting of the human U2OS osterosarcoma cell line transfected with both ERα and ER-specific Luciferase construct is currently under validation to be included in OECD Test Guideline 455.

== Other references ==
- Has, Ulla (2015). OECD Conceptual Framework for Testing and Assessment of Endocrine Disrupters as a basis for regulation of substances with endocrine disrupting properties. Nordic Council of Ministers. ISBN 978-92-893-1073-4.
- Henshel, Diane Susan; Black, Marsha C; Harrass, M C (1999). Environmental Toxicology and Risk Assessment: Standardization of Biomarkers for Endocrine Disruption and Environmental Assessment. American Society for Testing Materials, 1911. ISBN 978-0-8031-2618-3.
- OECD. "OECD Guidelines for the Testing of Chemicals". OECD Guidelines for the Testing of Chemicals. Section 1, Physical-Chemical Properties: Section 1: Physical–Chemical properties. ISSN 2074-5753.
