= INT =

INT or int may refer to:

- abbreviation for interjection
- Telecom & Management SudParis, formerly Institut National des Télécommunications (INT), a French higher education institute
- Telecom SudParis, formerly Telecom INT, a French grande ecole, graduate school for engineers
- Telecom Business School, formerly INT Management, a French Grande Ecole, graduate business school
- Inter Milan, a football club in Milan, Italy
- Smith Reynolds Airport, Winston-Salem, North Carolina
- The Israel National Trail, a hiking trail that crosses Israel
- The Indian National Theatre, a theatre organisation and troupe based in Mumbai, India
- an interception in American football statistics
- The Interstate Railroad, A former US railroad.
- Int Base, the headquarters of the Church of Scientology
- Ingatestone railway station (National Rail station code: INT), a railway station in Brentwood, Essex, England
- Incomplete neighbor tone (INT), a type of non-chord tone in music

== Mathematics and science ==
- int(S) means the interior of set S
- int() is the integer function, also known as the floor function, which rounds its argument down to the nearest lower (or equal) whole number
- \int, the LaTeX command that produces integral symbols
- INT (chemical), a synthetic dye
- Isaac Newton Telescope, an optical telescope in the Canary Islands

== Computing ==
- int, short for integer in many programming languages
- shorthand for interrupt
  - INT (x86 instruction), an assembly language instruction for the x86 architecture for generating a software interrupt
- abbreviation for internationalization
- .int, a generic top-level domain (gTLD)
- INT - Interactive software development environment. Often a segregated computer network used for testing current and future software releases.

== Popular culture ==
- The Intelligence statistic in Dungeons & Dragons and similar games
- The /int/ international board on 4chan
