= Cytotoxicity =

Quality of being toxic to cells

Cytotoxicity refers to the capacity of a substance or agent to damage or kill living cells, reflecting a critical parameter in pharmacology, toxicology, and biomedicine. It is distinct from cytostatic effects, which inhibit cell growth and proliferation without causing cell death. Cytotoxic agents can induce a range of cellular responses, including inhibition of cell growth, induction of apoptotic or necrotic cell death, and disruption of metabolic or structural cellular integrity. Assessing cytotoxicity is fundamental for evaluating the safety and efficacy of pharmaceutical compounds, chemicals, and biomaterials, as it helps predict potential adverse effects and guides therapeutic development.

Various assays—based on enzyme activity, membrane permeability, metabolic activity, or cell proliferation—are routinely employed to characterize and quantify cytotoxic effects in vitro, providing essential insights into cell viability and the mechanisms underlying toxic responses.

== Types ==
Morphological types of cell toxicity are classified into three main categories—apoptosis, autophagy, and necrosis—each with distinct structural and mechanistic features.

Apoptosis (type I cell death) is characterized by nuclear condensation, cell shrinkage, membrane blebbing, and the formation of apoptotic bodies, typically cleared by phagocytosis. This regulated process involves signaling pathways leading to the activation of caspases and DNA fragmentation. Autophagy-dependent cell death (type II) shows cytoplasmic vacuolization with abundant autophagosomes, mild nuclear changes, and typically involves catabolic processes to degrade cellular organelles via the lysosomal pathway. Necrosis (type III), in contrast, is marked by swelling of organelles and the plasma membrane, culminating in membrane rupture and the uncontrolled release of cellular contents, often resulting in inflammation; it is generally associated with acute, severe injury that disrupts cell homeostasis and energetics, such as ATP depletion or loss of membrane integrity.

Advances have expanded this framework to include mechanistically distinct forms like necroptosis, pyroptosis, and ferroptosis, each with unique morphological hallmarks but often overlapping features, underlining the complexity and evolving nature of the classification of cell toxicity.

Cells undergoing necrosis typically swell rapidly, lose membrane integrity, shut down metabolism, and release their contents into the surrounding environment. In vitro, rapid necrosis does not allow sufficient time or energy for activation of apoptotic pathways, and such cells therefore fail to express apoptotic markers. By contrast, apoptosis is defined by characteristic cytological and molecular events, including changes in the cell's refractive index, cytoplasmic shrinkage, nuclear condensation, and fragmentation of DNA into regularly sized pieces. In culture, apoptotic cells eventually progress to secondary necrosis, at which point they lose membrane integrity, cease metabolism, and undergo lysis.

== Measurement ==
Cytotoxicity assays are widely used in the pharmaceutical industry to evaluate compounds for cytotoxic effects. In drug discovery, researchers may screen for cytotoxic compounds when developing therapeutics that target rapidly dividing cancer cells, or conversely, assess initial "hits" from high-throughput screens to exclude those with unwanted cytotoxicity before further development.

=== Cell membrane integrity ===
One of the most common approaches is to assess cell membrane integrity. Healthy cells exclude vital dyes such as trypan blue or propidium iodide, whereas damaged membranes allow these dyes to enter and stain intracellular components. Conversely, intracellular molecules may leak into the culture medium when membrane integrity is lost. A widely used example is the lactate dehydrogenase (LDH) assay, in which LDH released from damaged cells reduces NAD to NADH, producing a detectable color change with a specific probe. Protease-based biomarkers can also distinguish live and dead cells within the same population. The live-cell protease remains active only in cells with intact membranes, while the dead-cell protease is detectable in the medium only after membrane disruption.

=== Redox activity ===
Other assays rely on cellular redox activity. These include the MTT assay; the XTT assay, which produces a water-soluble product; and the MTS assay, which measures reducing potential via a colorimetric reaction. Viable cells convert the MTS reagent into a colored formazan product. A related assay employs the fluorescent dye resazurin. ATP-based viability assays are also common, including bioluminescent methods in which ATP serves as the limiting reagent for the luciferase reaction.

=== Other methods ===
Additional methods include the sulforhodamine B (SRB) assay, WST assay, and the clonogenic assay. To minimize assay-specific false positives or negatives, multiple assays can be combined and applied sequentially to the same cells. For example, LDH-XTT-NR (neutral red)-SRB combinations are commercially available as kit formats.

Label-free techniques are also used to monitor cytotoxicity in real time. Electric cell-substrate impedance sensing (ECIS) measures changes in electrical impedance of adherent cells grown on gold-film electrodes, providing kinetic information rather than a single endpoint measurement.

== Labeling ==
Cytotoxic materials, such as biomedical waste, are often labeled with a symbol showing a capital "C" inside a triangle.

== Prediction ==
A highly important topic is the prediction of cytotoxicity of chemical compounds based on previous measurements, i.e. in-silico testing. For this purpose many QSAR and virtual screening methods have been suggested. An independent comparison of these methods has been done within the "Toxicology in the 21st century" project.

== Clinical significance ==
=== Cancer ===
Some chemotherapies contain cytotoxic drugs, whose purpose is interfering with the cell division. These drugs cannot distinguish between normal and malignant cells, but they inhibit the overall process of cell division with the purpose to kill the cancers before the hosts.

=== Immune system ===
Antibody-dependent cell-mediated cytotoxicity (ADCC) describes the cell-killing ability of certain lymphocytes, which requires the target cell being marked by an antibody. Lymphocyte-mediated cytotoxicity, on the other hand, does not have to be mediated by antibodies; nor does complement-dependent cytotoxicity (CDC), which is mediated by the complement system.

Three groups of cytotoxic lymphocytes are distinguished:

- Cytotoxic T cells
- Natural killer cells
- Natural killer T cells

== See also ==
- Antireticular cytotoxic serum
- Host–pathogen interaction
- Membrane vesicle trafficking
- Snake venom
