= Mir-618 microRNA precursor family =

mir-618

Identifiers
- Symbol: mir-618
- Rfam: RF01034
- miRBase family: MIPF0000553

Other data
- RNA type: microRNA
- Domain(s): Eukaryota
- PDB structures: PDBe

mir-618 microRNA is a short non-coding RNA molecule belonging both to the family of microRNAs and to that of small interfering RNAs (siRNAs). MicroRNAs function to regulate the expression levels of other genes by several mechanisms, whilst siRNAs are involved primarily with the RNA interference (RNAi) pathway.

== miR-618 in oestrogen treatment ==
Decreased levels of miR-618 have been observed in estradiol(E2)-stimulated MCF-7 breast cancer cells following hormone deprivation. Intracellular miR-618 levels can be regulated by E2 via the ER2 receptor. This points towards a possible of this miRNA, amongst others, in modulating the final gene responses to the oestrogen family of hormones in breast cancer cells.

== Microgravity effects in lymphoblastoid cells ==
Altered expression of miR-618 has been seen in the human lymphoblastoid TK6 cell line, with downregulation following stress-related stimulated microgravity in TK6 cells. This further influences several genes involved in regulation of the NF-κB-related pathway network.

== See also ==
- MicroRNA
