= MELISA =

Blood test for hypersensitivity

MELISA (Memory Lymphocyte Immunostimulation Assay) is a blood test that detects type IV hypersensitivity to metals, chemicals, environmental toxins and molds. Type IV hypersensitivity reactions, particularly to nickel, are well established and may affect 20% of the population.

== Mechanism ==
The MELISA test measures type-IV delayed hypersensitivity reaction. Type-IV reactions are mediated by T-lymphocytes (or memory lymphocytes) that have had prior contact with a given allergen. This is in contrast to a type-I allergy, which is mediated by IgE antibodies and is often tested using an ELISA test. In genetically predisposed individuals, an ongoing exposure to allergens can induce type-IV hypersensitivity.

The MELISA assay is a cell culture and requires live memory lymphocytes. Lymphocytes are isolated from a blood sample and cultured in an incubator for five days. A portion of the blood is kept intact (unexposed to allergens) to serve as a negative control. A second portion is exposed to a universal allergen, Pokeweed, to serve as a positive control. Finally, the blood is exposed to the suspected allergen/s in several different concentrations, to ensure that the conditions in vitro are as similar as possible to those in vivo. The lymphocyte reaction to each allergen is measured by two separate technologies: one based on the uptake of a radioactive isotope, ^{3}H-thymidine, by dividing lymphocytes (proliferation); the other by cell staining and microscopy evaluation. The level of reactivity is measured as a Stimulation Index (SI), against the naïve lymphocytes from the unexposed sample (negative control). Viability and reactivity are determined by cell count as well as reaction to the positive control.

MELISA is an optimised, standardised version of the lymphocyte transformation test (LTT) which was developed in the early 1960s to help identify allergies to drugs, metabolites and metals. The LTT for beryllium is now accepted as the gold standard for diagnosing berylliosis.

MELISA differs from standard LTTs in several ways:

- MELISA uses morphological screening to provide an additional level of accuracy. This ensures that non-hypersensitivity related cells (e.g. macrophages) are not included in the radioactively positive counts
- MELISA uses partially depleted monocytes to replicate the lymphocyte/monocyte balance in vivo
- MELISA utilizes a greater number of lymphocytes than other LTTs (1 million cells). As memory cells are relatively rare this higher concentration of lymphocytes ensures improved sensitivity.

== Applications ==
=== Dentistry ===
MELISA was further developed to help to assess the impact of hypersensitivity to metals used in dentistry. Hypersensitivity to dental metals may be associated with local oral reactions including oral lichen planus, stomatitis and ulceration.

The frequency of metal-induced lymphocyte responses was examined in 3,162 dental patients in three European laboratories using the MELISA test. The patients suffered from local and systemic symptoms attributed to their dental restorations. The effect of dental metal removal was studied in 111 patients with metal hypersensitivity and symptoms resembling chronic fatigue syndrome (CFS). After consultation with a dentist, a subgroup of 111 patients who showed allergy to their dental metals replaced their restorations with non-metallic materials. Nickel was the most common sensitizer, followed by inorganic mercury, gold, phenylmercury, cadmium and palladium. As compared to lymphocyte responses in healthy subjects, the CFS group had significantly increased responses to several metals, especially to inorganic mercury, phenylmercury and gold.

Following dental metal removal:

- 76% reported long-term health improvement
- 22% reported unchanged health
- 2% reported worsening of symptoms

=== Orthopaedics and surgery ===
Type IV hypersensitivity to metals is common, particularly to nickel, however hypersensitivity related complications associated with metal implants are less frequently reported. Potential hypersensitivity complications include skin rashes, chronic joint pain, swelling, aseptic loosening, and joint failure.

Many authors conclude that LTT-based blood tests like MELISA may be a better option for detecting systemic allergies from implants, while patch testing is better suited to detecting dermal hypersensitivity. They add that LTT based testing may also be a good option in cases of indeterminate hypersensitivity or in patients with joint failure of an unknown cause since it has higher sensitivity than patch testing

Some surgeons and researchers suggest LTT testing prior to surgery in patients with suspected/self-reported metal allergy

=== Titanium hypersensitivity ===
Titanium and its main alloy (Ti6Al4V) are generally seen as hypoallergenic options for arthroplasty and for dental implants. Although uncommon, with a prevalence estimated at between 0.6 and 6.3%, titanium hypersensitivity has been reported post-implantation with symptoms including impaired fracture healing, local eczema, pain, swelling, systemic dermatitis, implant loosening, and failure, all of which have been reported to resolve with implant removal and replacement with a non-titanium implant

In spinal surgery, microscopic titanium particles are present in the tissues surrounding the implant. These particles activate macrophages that increase bone absorption and inflammatory reactions. Released nanoparticles will circulate in the body fluids, eventually accumulating in remote organs.

Titanium has been shown to induce clinically relevant hypersensitivity which can be detected with MELISA testing. The accuracy of patch testing for titanium allergy, in particular, seems to be variable; the Mayo clinic failed to find any positive reactions to titanium in over a decade, despite several published cases of titanium allergy.

=== Chronic diseases ===
The test is also used to determine whether metal allergy is a contributing factor in the development of chronic diseases such as CFS (Sterzl, et al., 1999) and multiple sclerosis. The authors hypothesize that if the immune system is constantly displaying an allergic reaction to a metal present in the body, this will alert the HPA axis inducing fatigue-like symptoms. A study (Stejskal, et al., 1999) of 930 patients with CFS-like symptoms showed 62% testing MELISA-positive to metal allergy. Of those who removed the offending metals, 76% improved, but there was no placebo control. Metal hypersensitivity is not widely recognized by researchers as an accepted cause of CFS or multiple sclerosis.

=== Occupational medicine ===
The MELISA test is used in occupational medicine and environmental health. It has been used to screen workers exposed to metals, chemicals or other allergens in their workplace. This is what the test was developed for originally, at Astra's (now Astra-Zeneca) laboratories in Södertälje, Sweden. In the U.S., a similar technique (BeLT) is routinely used to screen for beryllium allergy in asymptomatic workers exposed to beryllium dust (Mroz, et al., 1991) (Newman LS, 1996).

== Validity ==
Whilst two articles have concluded that the MELISA test may give false positive (Cederbrant, et al., 1999) (Cederbrant, et al., 1997) reactions, a subsequent study concluded the MELISA test is "reproducible, sensitive, specific, and reliable for detecting metal sensitivity in metal-sensitive patients." (Valentine-Thon & Schiawara, 2003)

The developers of the MELISA test argue that the critical articles calculated the sensitivity and specificity of in vitro lymphocyte proliferation tests using patch testing as its reference. It is well known that patch testing can cause irritative local reactions. It is generally agreed that LTT based tests like MELISA are better suited for diagnosing implant-related metals sensitivity than patch testing as the relationship between skin hypersensitivity and systemic hypersensitivity (Ständer, et al., 2017) is ill-defined. Performing the LTT under optimised stimulating conditions might be a useful additional tool for the diagnosis of hypersensitivity (Ständer, et al., 2017) (FDA, 2019). To test whether patients with symptoms attributed to dental amalgam differed from healthy controls, a study compared 23 amalgam patients, 30 subjects who considered themselves healthy with amalgams and 10 subjects without amalgam using MELISA and other tests. The researchers found that a high frequency of positive results was obtained among healthy subjects with or without dental amalgam, and concluded that the test cannot be used as an objective test for mercury allergy (Cederbrant, et al., 1999).

Another study by the same critical author used 34 patients to test the sensitivity and specificity if the MELISA test, and concluded that it is not useful for diagnosis of contact allergy to the metals gold, palladium and nickel, since many false-positive results will be obtained (Cederbrant, et al., 1997). The clinical relevance of the test has been shown by the decrease of patient-reported metal-specific responses following the removal of the allergy-causing metals (however the trial did not have a placebo control). (Stejskal, et al., 2006) (Valentine-Thon, et al., 2006)
