= Syndromic testing =

Simultaneous testing for pathogens with symptomatic overlap

Syndromic testing is a process by which a healthcare provider simultaneously tests a patient for multiple pathogens with overlapping symptomology. This allows providers to order one test to see if patients are suffering from any one of multiple causes, rather than having to order a test for each potential underlying reason for the illness. It can be used with patients that are immunosuppressed, in hospital environments that have limited testing assets, or patients that could be suffering from any number of or combination of reasons for a specific syndrome, such as respiratory distress, gastroenteritis, bloodstream infections, or CNS infections. The test uses multi-panel syndromic assays that allow the simultaneous detection of a number of agents, increasing the accuracy of tests for microbial agents. The first multiplex panel for syndromic testing to be approved by the FDA received approval in 2008, and since, panels for several potential pathogens have been approved.
