= Formazan =

Class of chemical compounds; intensely colorful dyes

The formazans are compounds of the general formula [R−N=N−C(R')=N−NH−R"], formally derivatives of formazan [H_{2}NN−CHN=NH], unknown in free form.

Formazan dyes are artificial chromogenic products obtained by reduction of tetrazolium salts by dehydrogenases and reductases. They have a variety of colors from dark blue to deep red to orange, depending on the original tetrazolium salt used as the substrate for the reaction.

== Structure and reactivity ==
Formazans are intensely colorful compounds characterized by the following structure: [−N=N−C(R)=N−NH−], and are closely related to azo (−N=N−) dyes. Their structure was first defined in 1892, by von Pechmann and by Bamberger and Wheelwright independently. Their deep colour and redox chemistry derive from their nitrogen-rich backbone.

Formazans have a high tautomeric and conformational flexibility. Due to the two alternating double bonds in the backbone, formazans can exist in four possible isomeric forms: syn, s-cis (closed form); syn, s-trans (open form); anti, s-cis; and anti, s-trans (linear form).

1,5-disubstituted formazans can exist as two tautomers (1 and 2 in the image below). Upon deprotonation, the formed anion (3) is stabilized by resonance. With transition metal ions (Cu^{2+}, Co^{3+}, Ni^{2+}, Zn^{2+}, etc), formazans form highly coloured complexes (chelates).

Due to their ability to react with both strong acids and bases, formazans can be considered amphoteric.

Oxidation of such compounds results in their conversion into colorless tetrazolium salts. Among the various oxidants used are mercuric oxide, nitric acid, isoamyl nitrite, N-bromo succinimide, potassium permanganate, lead tetra-acetate and t-butyl hypochlorite. Depending on the conditions, tetrazolium salts can be reduced to form tetrazolyl radicals or formazan:

== Synthesis ==
There are various synthetic methods for the synthesis of formazans.

The reaction of diazonium compounds with aldehyde hydrazones is one of the most common procedures to produce formazans. Hydrazones, which are electron-rich compounds, react with diazonium salts either at a nitrogen or a carbon atom to produce formazans. Diazonium salts couple to the amine nitrogen in the hydrazone with displacement of a hydrogen to give the intermediate, which then rearranges to the formazan.

Another form to synthesize formazans is by the reaction of active methylene compounds with diazonium salts. Diazonium salts add to active methylene compounds to form an intermediate azo compound, followed by the addition of a second diazonium salt (under more alkaline conditions), yielding tetrazene, which then forms a 3-substituted formazan.

Formazans can also be produced by the oxidation of the corresponding hydrazidines, usually prepared via reaction of hydrazonyl halides with the appropriate hydrazine derivatives. For example, ethyl formate or orthoformate reacts with two equivalents of phenylhydrazine to yield 1,5-diphenylformazan, under acidic conditions. Under basic conditions, ethyl nitrate reacts at the methylene position to yield 3-methyl-1,5-diphenylformazan, which can also be obtained from the reaction of phenylazoethane with isoamyl nitrite.

Additionally, formazans can be obtained by the decomposition of substituted tetrazolium salts either photochemically or under the influence of ascorbic acid in an alkaline medium.

== Application ==
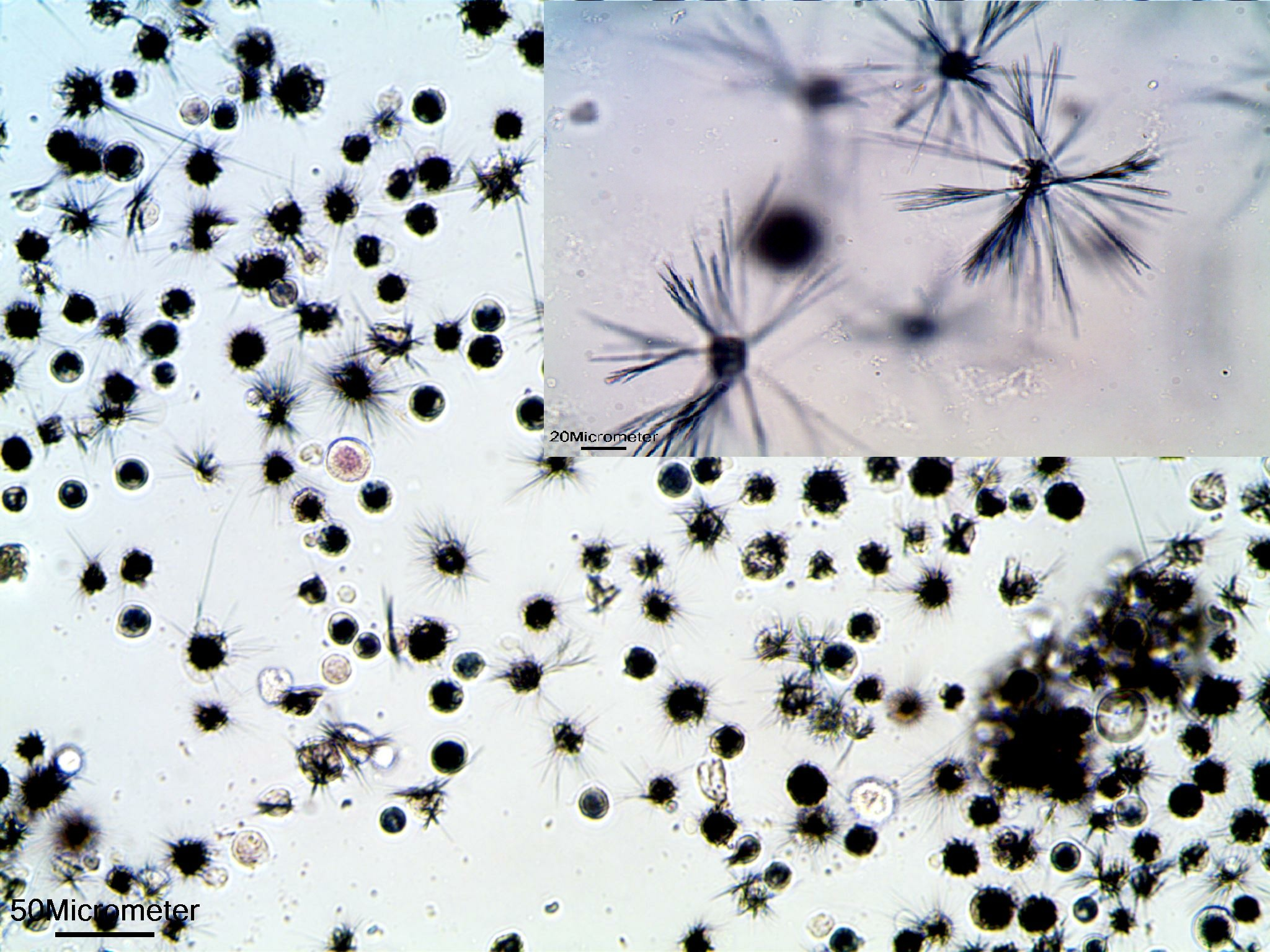
MTT test: Formation of formazan crystals from MTT in mesenchymal stem cells

Tetrazolium salts and their formazan products are widely used in histochemical methods, especially in colorimetric viability assays. These procedures are based on the reduction of tetrazolium by mitochondrial dehydrogenase enzymes, which is carried inside living cells:

Leading examples of the most used tetrazolium salts include:

- INT or 2-(4-iodophenyl)-3-(4-nitrophenyl)-5-phenyl-2H-tetrazolium chloride, which is water-insoluble.
- MTT or 3-(4,5-dimethyl-2-thiazolyl)-2, 5-diphenyl-2H-tetrazolium bromide, which is water-insoluble and used in the MTT assay.
- XTT or 2,3-bis-(2-methoxy-4-nitro-5-sulfophenyl)-2H-tetrazolium-5-carboxanilide, which is water-soluble.
- MTS or 3-(4,5-dimethylthiazol-2-yl)-5-(3-carboxymethoxyphenyl)-2-(4-sulfophenyl)-2H-tetrazolium, which is water-soluble and used in the MTS assay.
- TTC or tetrazolium chloride or 2,3,5-triphenyl-2H-tetrazolium chloride, which is water-soluble.
- NBT used in a diagnostic test, particularly for chronic granulomatous disease and other diseases of phagocyte function.

When reduced in a cell, either enzymatically or through direct reaction with NADH or NADPH, the classical tetrazolium salt, MTT, turns blue to purple and may form an insoluble precipitate. These formazan dyes are commonly used in cell proliferation and toxicity assays such as the EpiDerm and EpiSkin tests since they only stain living, metabolically active cells.
