= Tetrazolium chloride =

Redox indicator

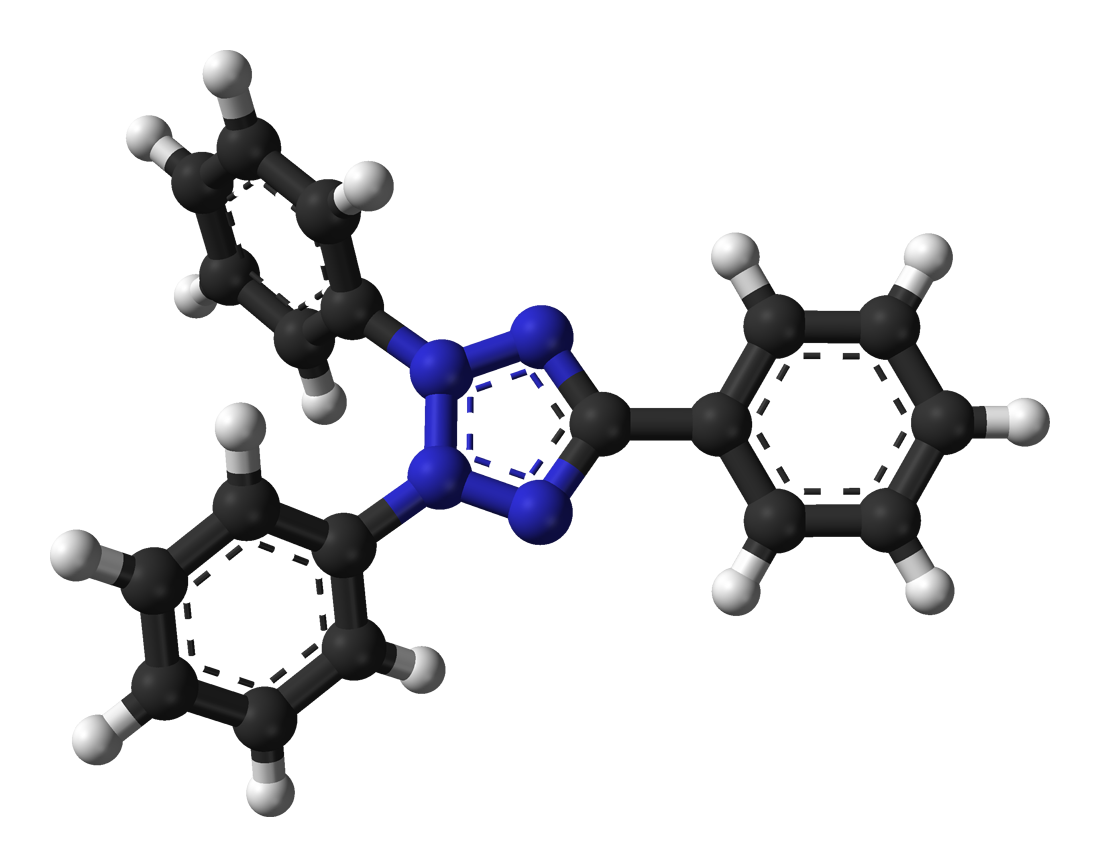
- 3D structure of the triphenyltetrazolium cation

Names
- IUPAC name 2,3,5-Triphenyl-2H-tetrazolium chloride
- Other names TTC

Identifiers
CAS Number	298-96-4
3D model (JSmol)	Interactive image
ChEBI	CHEBI:78019
ChemSpider	8926
ECHA InfoCard	100.005.520
UNII	D25727K0RB
CompTox Dashboard (EPA)	DTXSID30889340
- InChI: InChI=1S/CH2N4.ClH/c1-2-4-5-3-1;/h1H,(H,2,3,4,5);1H Key: JXCNUCFTHLGXDQ-UHFFFAOYSA-N; InChI=1/CH2N4.ClH/c1-2-4-5-3-1;/h1H,(H,2,3,4,5);1H Key: JXCNUCFTHLGXDQ-UHFFFAOYAY
- SMILES: [Cl-].n1c[nH+]nn1

Properties
Chemical formula	C_{19}H_{15}ClN_{4}
Molar mass	334.81 g·mol^{−1}
Appearance	White crystalline powder
log P	−2.4
- Except where otherwise noted, data are given for materials in their standard state (at 25 °C [77 °F], 100 kPa). verify (what is ?) Infobox references

Triphenyl tetrazolium chloride (TTC), or simply tetrazolium chloride (with the formula 2,3,5-triphenyl-2H-tetrazolium chloride) is a redox indicator commonly used in biochemical experiments especially to indicate cellular respiration. It is a white crystalline powder, soluble in water, ethanol and acetone but insoluble in ether.

Reduction of tetrazolium salts by dehydrogenases and reductases yields chromogenic formazan dyes. They have a variety of colors from dark blue to deep red to orange, depending on the original tetrazolium salt used as the substrate for the reaction.

== TTC assay ==
In the TTC assay (also known as TTC test or tetrazolium test), TTC is used to differentiate between metabolically active and inactive tissues. The white compound is enzymatically reduced to red TPF (1,3,5-triphenylformazan) in living tissues due to the activity of various dehydrogenases (enzymes important in oxidation of organic compounds and thus cellular metabolism), while it remains as white TTC in areas of necrosis since these enzymes have been either denatured or degraded.

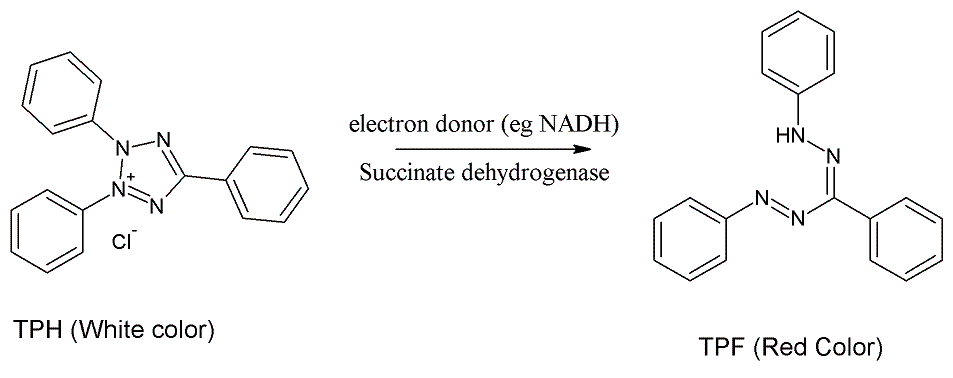

For this reason, TTC has been employed in autopsy pathology to assist post-mortem identification of myocardial infarctions. Healthy viable heart muscle will stain deep red from the cardiac lactate dehydrogenase, while areas of potential infarctions will be more pale.

TTC is somewhat unstable to heat and light, so these environments should be avoided during the assay.

== See also ==
- MTT assay
- Seed testing
