= Ethidium homodimer assay =

An ethidium homodimer assay can be used to detect dead or dying cells. Ethidium homodimer is a membrane-impermeable fluorescent dye which binds to DNA. After a cell sample has been stained with ethidium homodimer, the dead cells may be viewed and counted under a UV-light microscope.

When cells die, the plasma membranes of those cells becomes disrupted. Because of this, ethidium homodimer may enter those cells and bind to DNA within those cells. Because live cells don't have a compromised membrane, the ethidium homodimer can't enter.

One reason for doing an ethidium homodimer assay instead of using a TUNEL assay to measure cell death is that ethidium homodimer stains all of the dead or dying cells, while TUNEL only stains cells that have undergone programmed cell death.
