= Electric cell-substrate impedance sensing =

Electric cell-substrate impedance sensing or ECIS (a trademark of Applied BioPhysics Inc.) refers to a non-invasive biophysical approach to monitor living animal cells in vitro, i.e. within a well-defined laboratory environment.

In ECIS the cells are grown on the surface of small and planar gold-film electrodes, which are deposited on the bottom of a cell culture dish (Petri dish). The AC impedance of the cell-covered electrode is then measured at one or several frequencies as a function of time. Due to the insulating properties of their membranes the cells behave like dielectric particles so that the impedance increases with increasing coverage of the electrode until a confluent (i.e. continuous) layer of cells is established. In confluent cell layers the measured impedance is mainly determined by the three-dimensional shape of the cells. If cell shape changes occur, the current pathways through and around the cell bodies change as well, leading to a corresponding increase or decrease of impedance. Thus, by recording time-resolved impedance measurements, cell shape changes can be followed in real time with sub-microscopic resolution and can be used for bioanalytic purposes.

As the shape of animal cells responds very sensitively to alterations in metabolism as well as chemical, biological or physical stimuli, the ECIS technique is applied in various experimental settings in cell biological research laboratories. It can be used as a sensor in cytotoxicity studies, drug development or as a non-invasive means to follow cell adhesion to in vitro surfaces. Equipments based on the ECIS technique are also dedicated to monitor the chemokinetic activity of adherent cells spread on the electrode surface (micromotion), barrier function, as well as their chemotactic activities in ECIS-based wound healing assays.

== See also ==
- Microphysiometry
