= MCF-7 =

Breast cancer cell line

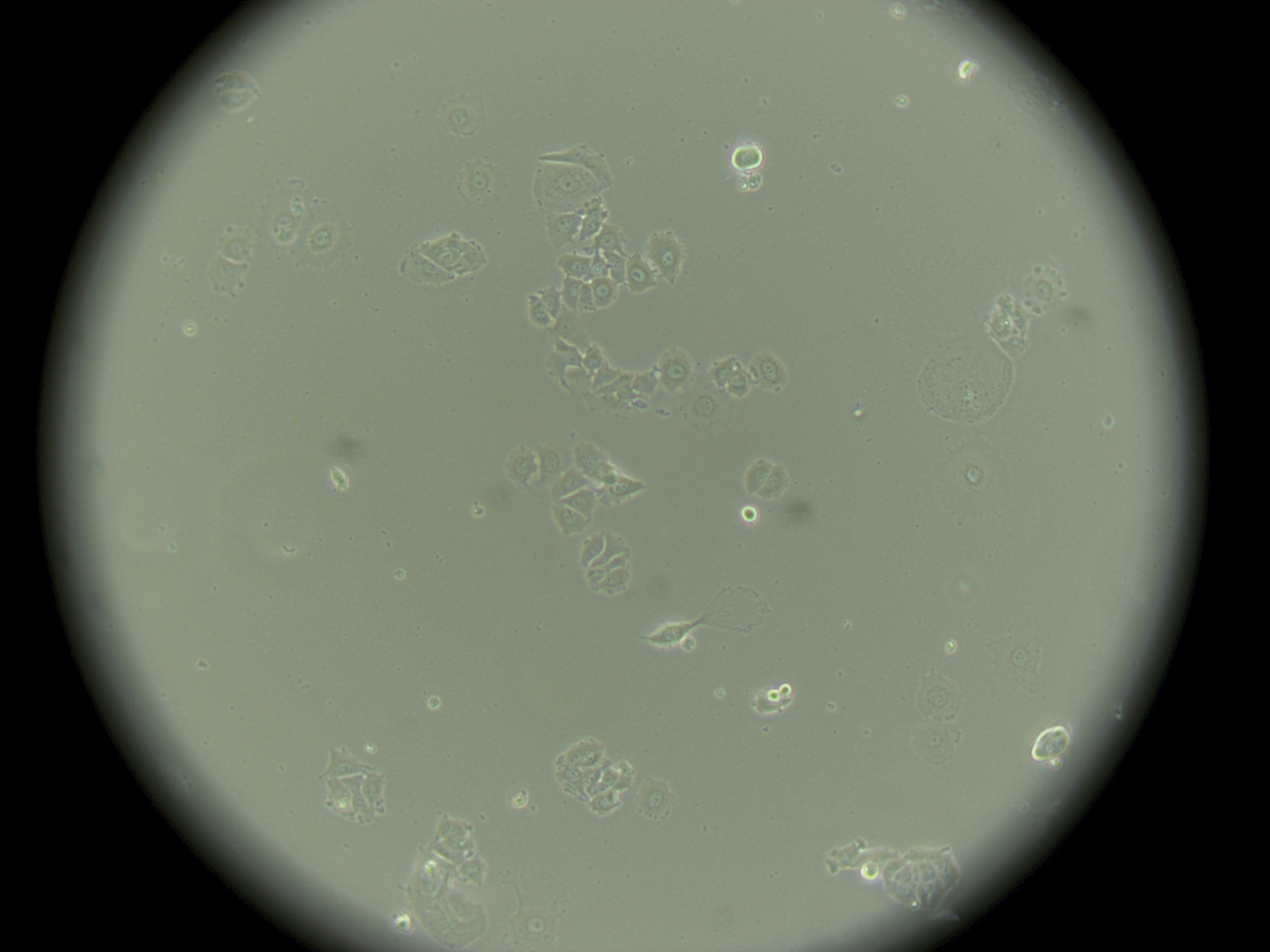
MCF-7 cells

MCF-7 is a breast cancer cell line. MCF-7 is the acronym of Michigan Cancer Foundation-7, referring to the institute in Detroit where the cell line was established in 1973 by Herbert Soule and co-workers. The Michigan Cancer Foundation is now known as the Barbara Ann Karmanos Cancer Institute.

MCF-7 and two other breast cancer cell lines, named T-47D and MDA-MB-231, account for more than two-thirds of all abstracts reporting studies on mentioned breast cancer cell lines, as concluded from a Medline-based survey.

== Isolation ==
MCF-7 was isolated in 1970 from a 69-year-old woman. The patient, Frances Mallon died in 1970 due to metastatic breast cancer. Her cells were the source of much of current knowledge about breast cancer.

Prior to MCF-7, it was not possible for cancer researchers to obtain a mammary cell line that was capable of living longer than a few months.

== Uses ==
MCF-7 has potential for new drug development, including anti-cancer drug testing, anti-estrogen drug resistance and antiplatelet drug development.

MCF-7 cells are also used in the E-SCREEN assay, an in vitro test for estrogenic activity based on estrogen-induced cell proliferation.

=== Antiproliferation ===
Tumor necrosis factor alpha (TNF alpha) inhibits the growth of MCF-7 breast cancer cells. Treatment with anti-estrogens can modulate the secretion of insulin-like growth factor binding proteins. Omega-3 and 6 fatty acids such as EPA, DHA and AA has been reported to inhibit MCF-7 cell line growth and proliferation.

Many studies indicate that the insulin-like growth factor 1 receptor is a crucial therapeutic target for treating cancer in MCF-7 cell lines. One notably effective treatment strategy is silencing this receptor using siRNA packaged in nanoparticles, which significantly suppresses the growth and proliferation of MCF-7 cancer cells.

The results of IC_{50} determination (Liu et al.) of compounds of Melilotus officinalis (Linn.) Pall. were published during 2018.

Tamoxifen increases FasL and TNF-α.

== Characteristics of MCF-7 cells ==
MCF-7 cells have the following characteristics:

- Primary tumor (invasive breast ductal carcinoma)
- Originate from pleural effusion
- 17β-estradiol receptors present
- Proliferative response to estrogens
- Presence of progesterone receptors
- Contains 17β-estradiol-binding protein
- Cannot have ERBB2 gene amplification (with Her2/neu protein overexpression)
- Tumorigenic in mice but only with estrogen supplementation if engrafted into the subcutaneous fat or mammary fat pad
- Tumorigenic in mice without estrogen supplementation if engrafted intraductally
- Luminal epithelial phenotype
- PIK3CA helical mutations were identified in MCF-7, but with low AKT activation.

This cell line retained several characteristics of differentiated mammary epithelium, including the ability to process estradiol via cytoplasmic estrogen receptors and the capability of forming domes.
