= Secretion assay =

Process used in cell biology

Secretion assay is a process used in cell biology to identify cells that are secreting a particular protein (usually a cytokine). It was first developed by Manz et al. in 1995.

Usually, a cell that is secreting the protein of interest is isolated using an antibody-antibody complex that coats the cell and is able to "catch" the secreted molecules. The cell is then detected by another fluorochrome-labelled antibody, and is subsequently extracted using a process called fluorescent-activated cell sorting (FACS). The FACS method is broadly similar to the enzyme-linked immunosorbent assay (ELISA) antibody format, except that the encapsulated cells remain intact. This is advantageous as the cells are still living after the extraction has taken place.

Further advances now mean that it is possible to extract the secreting cells using a magnetic-based separation system or using a flow cytometer.

A number of commercial applications exist for secretion assay. One such example is the Gel Microdrop (GMD) technology, developed by One Cell Systems. One Cell asserts that GMD typically recovers a higher number of viable secreting cells than other methods, whilst ignoring any cells which are not secreting the desired protein.
