= Sulforhodamine B =

Red fluorescent dye

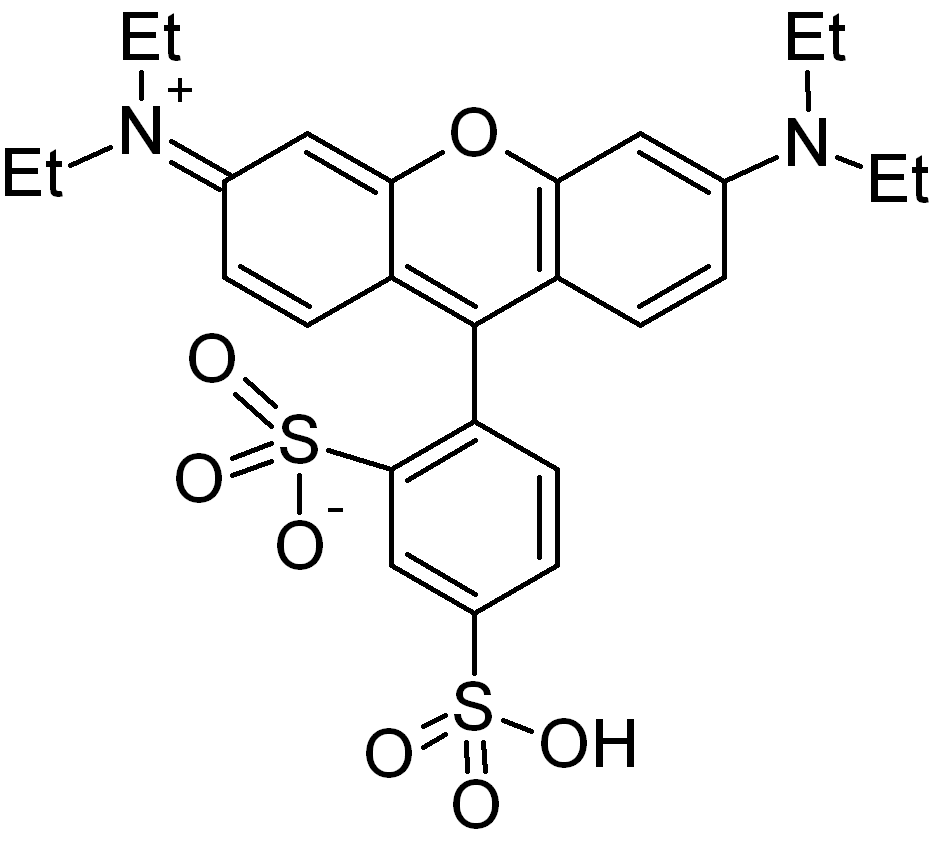
- Sulforhodamine B

Names
- IUPAC name 2-(3-diethylamino-6-diethylazaniumylidene-xanthen-9-yl)-5-sulfo-benzenesulfonate

Identifiers
CAS Number	3520-42-1
3D model (JSmol)	Interactive image
ChemSpider	58690
ECHA InfoCard	100.020.482
EC Number	220-025-2
PubChem CID	65191
UNII	821LWZ3R6R
CompTox Dashboard (EPA)	DTXSID4048068
- InChI: InChI=1S/C27H30N2O7S2/c1-5-28(6-2)18-9-12-21-24(15-18)36-25-16-19(29(7-3)8-4)10-13-22(25)27(21)23-14-11-20(37(30,31)32)17-26(23)38(33,34)35/h9-17H,5-8H2,1-4H3,(H-,30,31,32,33,34,35) Key: IOOMXAQUNPWDLL-UHFFFAOYSA-N; InChI=1/C27H30N2O7S2/c1-5-28(6-2)18-9-12-21-24(15-18)36-25-16-19(29(7-3)8-4)10-13-22(25)27(21)23-14-11-20(37(30,31)32)17-26(23)38(33,34)35/h9-17H,5-8H2,1-4H3,(H-,30,31,32,33,34,35) Key: IOOMXAQUNPWDLL-UHFFFAOYAJ
- SMILES: O=S(=O)(O)c4ccc(C=1c3c(OC=2C=1\C=C/C(=[N+](/CC)CC)/C=2)cc(cc3)N(CC)CC)c(c4)S([O-])(=O)=O

Properties
Chemical formula	C_{27}H_{30}N_{2}O_{7}S_{2}
Molar mass	558.666 g/mol
- Except where otherwise noted, data are given for materials in their standard state (at 25 °C [77 °F], 100 kPa). verify (what is ?) Infobox references

Sulforhodamine B or Kiton Red 620 (C_{27}H_{30}N_{2}O_{7}S_{2}) is a fluorescent dye with uses spanning from laser-induced fluorescence (LIF) to the quantification of cellular proteins of cultured cells. This red solid dye is very water-soluble.

== Spectroscopy ==
The dye has maximal absorbance at 565 nm light and maximal fluorescence emission at 586 nm light. It does not exhibit pH-dependent absorption or fluorescence over the range of 3 to 10.

== Applications ==
Sulforhodamine B is often used as a membrane-impermeable polar tracer or used for cell density determination via determination of cellular proteins (cytotoxicity assay).
