= ELISpot =

Medical laboratory test

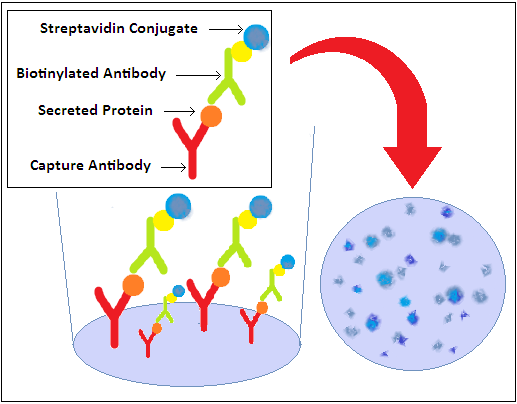
ELISpot assay illustration

The enzyme-linked immunosorbent spot (ELISpot) is a type of assay that focuses on quantitatively measuring the frequency of cytokine secretion for a single cell. The ELISpot Assay is also a form of immunostaining since it is classified as a technique that uses antibodies to detect a protein analyte, with the word analyte referring to any biological or chemical substance being identified or measured.

The FluoroSpot Assay is a variation of the ELISpot assay. The FluoroSpot Assay uses fluorescence in order to analyze multiple analytes, meaning it can detect the secretion of more than one type of protein.

== History ==
Cecil Czerkinsky first described ELISpot in 1983 as a new way to quantify the production of an antigen-specific immunoglobulin by hybridoma cells. In 1988, Czerkinsky developed an ELISA spot assay that quantified the secretion of a lymphokine by T cells. In the same year, dual-color ELISpot was combined with computer imaging for the first time, which allowed for the enumeration and analysis of spots. 1988 also marked the first use of membrane-bottomed plates for performing these assays.

== Mechanism of ELISpot ==
1. Antibody coating: Throughout the ELISpot Assay technique, different substances are added to and washed away from wells. Wells are found on a laboratory plate with tiny dishes/bowls that can be filled with a substance to be examined; the amount of wells on a plate varies, but it usually ranges from 16-100. The first substance added to the wells are cytokine specific monoclonal antibodies. These antibodies coat the walls of the wells for future binding to cytokine. The monoclonal antibodies means that the antibody is produced from a single cell lineage, and is only able to bind to one protein epitope. Polyclonal antibodies, on the other hand, are capable of binding to multiple epitopes of the same protein.
2. Cell incubation: The desired cells being observed and analyzed are added to the wells. Each well can have the presence or absence of stimuli that activate the secretion of cytokine in cells. During cell incubation, the cells are allowed to react to any present stimuli and secrete cytokine. There are many procedures and methods to follow to ensure proper cell handling. To make sure that cells are of high quality, cells in blood samples should be lightly agitated if stored for longer than 3 hours, the blood samples should be diluted in PBS (phosphate buffered saline) before being stored, and the blood samples should not have granulocytes. Any cells that have been cryopreserved and thawed should be allowed to rest for an hour or more at 37 degrees Celsius (the typical temperature of the human body). There are also many things that should be taken into consideration when incubating the cells, such as making sure that the cells do not experience sudden movements that could affect spot formation, or that the incubator's humidity is high enough to avoid excessive evaporation and drying out the wells.
3. Cytokine capture: Since the cells are surrounded by cytokine specific monoclonal antibodies that coat the walls of the wells, cytokine that has been secreted by the incubated cells will start to attach to the antibodies at a specific epitope.
4. Detection antibodies: At this point, the wells must be rinsed in order to get rid of the cells and any other undesirable substances. All that should remain are the cytokine specific monoclonal antibodies and any cytokine that bonded to the antibodies. Biotinylated cytokine-specific detection antibodies are then added to the well. These cytokine-specific detection antibodies will bind to any cytokine that is left in the well since the cytokine is still attached to the first set of antibodies used. Since the cytokine attached to the first set of antibodies coating the wells, the cytokine was not washed away when the wells were rinsed.
5. Streptavidin-enzyme conjugate: Streptavidin-enzyme conjugate is added to the wells in order to bind with the detection antibodies. The purpose of biotinylating the cytokine-specific detection antibodies added to the wells in the previous step is so that the antibody can bind to the new streptavidin-enzyme conjugate. Biotinylation basically creates a strong affinity between the biotin on the cytokine-specific antibody and the streptavidin on the conjugate.
6. Addition of substrate: A substrate is added to the wells, and is catalyzed by the enzyme conjugate added in the previous step. This reaction forms insoluble precipitate that forms spots in the wells. The substrate that you use in this step will depend on the type of enzyme used in the previous step. If streptavidin-ALP (streptavidin and alkaline phosphatase conjugate) is used, then using BCIP/NBT-plus (a mixture of 5-bromo-4-chloro-3-indolyl phosphate and nitroblue tetrazolium chloride) as a substrate will produce more distinct spots that are easier to analyze. If streptavidin-HRP (streptavidin and horseradish peroxidase conjugate) is used, then using TMB (tetramethylbenzidine) as a substrate will produce better results.
7. Analysis: The spots that are formed can then be read on an automated ELISpot reader, or counted under a dissection microscope, and further used to calculate the frequency of cytokine secretion.

=== Mechanism of FluoroSpot ===
The FluoroSpot assay is very similar to the ELISpot assay. The main difference is that the FluoroSpot assay is able to analyze the presence of multiple analytes on one plate of wells, whereas the ELISpot assay can only analyze one analyte at a time. The FluoroSpot assay accomplishes this by using fluorescence rather than an enzymatic reaction for detection. The steps for a FluoroSpot assay are also similar, with a few differences.

1. Antibody Coating: Similar to the ELISpot, cytokine-specific monoclonal capture antibodies are added to a plate with wells. For both assays, the plates are ethanol-treated to avoid contamination and skewed data collection. For the FluoroSpot assay, a mixture of different types of capture antibodies are attached to the wells in order to detect multiple types of analytes. In order to get optimal results with the ELISpot and the FluoroSpot assay, proper plate coating techniques should be followed. The plates should be treated with ethanol, washed, and then coated with antibodies. Ethanol treatment methods also vary depending on the type of plates that are used. For MSIP and IPFL plates, you should add 15 micro liters of 35% ethanol to all of the wells. Allow the ethanol to sit in the wells for one minute, and then pour it out. For MAIPSWU plates, you should instead add 50 micro liters of 70% ethanol to all of the wells. Allow the ethanol to sit in the wells for two minutes, and then pour it out. After you have treated the wells with ethanol, you need to wash all of the wells with 200 micro liters of sterile water. This washing process should be repeated for a total of 5 times. Once the wells have been treated with ethanol and washed, the cytokine-specific monoclonal capture antibodies can be added to each well.
2. Cell Incubation: Cell are added to the wells and are incubated in the presence or absence of stimuli that affect protein secretion.
3. Cytokine Capture: Proteins/analytes that are secreted by the incubated cells will bind to the capture antibodies attached to the wells during the first step.
4. Detection Antibodies: Similar to the ELISpot, once the wells are rinsed to get rid of the cells and other substances that we are not interested in identifying or measuring, a biotinylated detection antibody is added (this is specific for one type of analyte that you wish to quantify) and then tag-labeled detection antibodies are added for the second and third types of analytes being studied.
5. Fluorophore-labeled Conjugates: Instead of adding a streptavidin-enzyme conjugate, the detection of multiple analytes is amplified in the FluoroSpot with the use of fluorophore-labeled anti-tag antibody and streptavidin-fluorophore conjugate. A fluorescence enhancer solution is also added during this step in order to enhance the signals later used when analyzing the fluorescence colors in the wells. This fluorescence is what makes it possible for the FluoroSpot to analyze and compare multiple analytes, unlike the ELISpot.
6. Analysis: Since the FluoroSpot relies on the use of fluorescence and not an enzymatic reaction, there is no need for a step that adds a substrate to react with enzymes (as needed for the ELISpot). The last step for the FluoroSpot assay is to analyze the fluorophores under an automated fluorescence reader that has separate filters for the different fluorophores being analyzed. These filters should be selected for the specific wavelengths of the fluorophores if you want accurate measurements.

Since the FluoroSpot assay identifies and quantifies the presence of multiple analytes, it is possible that the absorption of one analyte can affect the secretion of another analyte; this is called capture effects. The effect an analyte has on another analyte could be positive or negative (the production of the second analyte can either increase or decrease). To counteract capture effects, it is possible to use co-stimulation in order to bypass the decreased production of an analyte. This is when a second antibody that stimulates the production of the same analyte is added to the wells.

== Applications of ELISpot and FluoroSpot ==
The ELISpot and FluoroSpot assays can be used in many research fields: vaccine development, cancer, allergies, monocytes/macrophages/dendritic cells characterization, apolipoproteins analysis, and veterinary research ^{[citations 10, 11, and 12 require update]}. With the ELISpot, you can study antigen-specific cytokine responses, antibody specific secreting cells, tumor antigens, granzyme B and Perforin release by T cells, vaccine efficacy, epitope mapping, cytotoxic T-cell activity, detection of IL-4, IL-5, and IL-13, vaccine-induced antibody responses, antigen-specific memory B cells, and much more.

More specifically, the T-cell ELISpot assay is used to characterize T-cell subsets. This is because the assay can detect the production of cytokines IFN-y, IL-2, TNF-alpha, IL-4, IL-5, and IL-13. The first three cytokines are produced by Th1 cells, while the last three are produced by Th2 cells. Measuring T-cell responses through cytokine production also makes it possible to study vaccine efficacy.

With T-cell FluoroSpot, you can monitor tumor-infiltrating lymphocytes. You can also analyze the IFN-y cytokine and granzyme B secretion in order to assess cytotoxic T-cell responses. Both of these are used for cancer research.

With B-cell FluoroSpot, vaccine efficacy can also be observed by quantifying the secretion of IgG, IgA, and IgM before and after a vaccination. This analysis of multiple immunoglobulins is made possible because of the fluorescence method used in the FluoroSpot.
