= MTT assay =

Technique for assessing cell activity

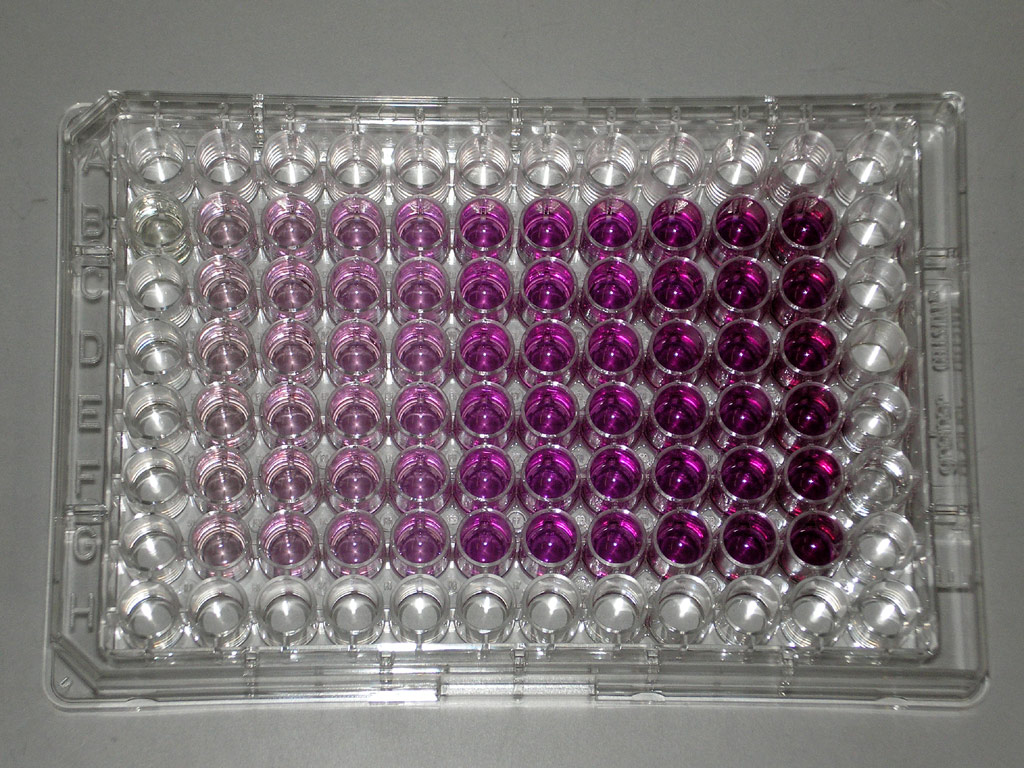
A microtiter plate after an MTT assay. Increasing amounts of cells resulted in increased purple colouring.

The MTT assay is a colorimetric assay for assessing cell metabolic activity. NAD(P)H-dependent cellular oxidoreductase enzymes may, under defined conditions, reflect the number of viable cells present. These enzymes are capable of reducing the tetrazolium dye MTT, which is chemically 3-(4,5-di methyl thiazol-2-yl)-2,5-diphenyltetrazolium bromide, to its insoluble formazan, which has a purple color. Other closely related tetrazolium dyes including XTT, MTS and the WSTs, are used in conjunction with the intermediate electron acceptor, 1-methoxy phenazine methosulfate (PMS). With WST-1, which is cell-impermeable, reduction occurs outside the cell via plasma membrane electron transport. However, this traditionally assumed explanation is currently contended as proof has also been found of MTT reduction to formazan in lipidic cellular structures without apparent involvement of oxidoreductases.

Tetrazolium dye assays can also be used to measure cytotoxicity (loss of viable cells) or cytostatic activity (shift from proliferation to quiescence) of potential medicinal agents and toxic materials. MTT assays are usually done in the dark since the MTT reagent is sensitive to light.

== MTT and related tetrazolium salts ==
MTT, a yellow tetrazole, is reduced to purple formazan in living cells. A solubilization solution (usually either dimethyl sulfoxide, an acidified ethanol solution, or a solution of the detergent sodium dodecyl sulfate in diluted hydrochloric acid) is added to dissolve the insoluble purple formazan product into a colored solution. The absorbance of this colored solution can be quantified by measuring at a certain wavelength (usually between 500 and 600 nm) by a spectrophotometer. The degree of light absorption is dependent on the degree of formazan concentration accumulated inside the cell and on the cell surface. The greater the formazan concentration, the deeper the purple colour and thus the higher the absorbance.

XTT (2,3-bis-(2-methoxy-4-nitro-5-sulfophenyl)-2H-tetrazolium-5-carboxanilide) has been proposed to replace MTT, yielding higher sensitivity and a higher dynamic range. The formed formazan dye is water-soluble, avoiding a final solubilization step.

Water-soluble tetrazolium salts are more recent alternatives to MTT: they were developed by introducing positive or negative charges and hydroxy groups to the phenyl ring of the tetrazolium salt, or better with sulfonate groups added directly or indirectly to the phenyl ring.

MTS (3-(4,5-dimethylthiazol-2-yl)-5-(3-carboxymethoxyphenyl)-2-(4-sulfophenyl)-2H-tetrazolium), in the presence of phenazine methosulfate (PMS), produces a formazan product that has an absorbance maximum at 490 nm in phosphate-buffered saline. The MTS assay is often described as a 'one-step' MTT assay, which offers the convenience of adding the reagent straight to the cell culture without the intermittent steps required in the MTT assay. However this convenience makes the MTS assay susceptible to colorimetric interference as the intermittent steps in the MTT assay remove traces of coloured compounds, whilst these remain in the microtitre plate in the one-step MTS assay. Precautions are needed to ensure accuracy when using this assay and there are strong arguments for confirming MTS results using qualitative observations under a microscope. (This, however, is prudent for all colormetric assays.)

WSTs (water-soluble tetrazolium salts) are a series of other water-soluble dyes for MTT assays, developed to give different absorption spectra of the formed formazans. WST-1 and in particular WST-8 (2-(2-methoxy-4-nitrophenyl)-3-(4-nitrophenyl)-5-(2,4-disulfophenyl)-2H-tetrazolium), are advantageous over MTT in that they are reduced outside cells, combined with PMS electron mediator, and yield a water-soluble formazan. Finally, WST assays (1) can be read directly (unlike MTT that needs a solubilization step), (2) give a more effective signal than MTT, and (3) decrease toxicity to cells (unlike cell-permeable MTT, and its insoluble formazan that accumulate inside cells).

== Significance ==
Tetrazolium dye reduction is generally assumed to be dependent on NAD(P)H-dependent oxidoreductase enzymes largely in the cytosolic compartment of the cell. Therefore, reduction of MTT and other tetrazolium dyes depends on the cellular metabolic activity due to NAD(P)H flux. Cells with a low metabolism such as thymocytes and splenocytes reduce very little MTT. In contrast, rapidly dividing cells exhibit high rates of MTT reduction. It is important to keep in mind that assay conditions can alter metabolic activity and thus tetrazolium dye reduction without affecting cell viability. In addition, the mechanism of reduction of tetrazolium dyes, i.e. intracellular (MTT, MTS) vs. extracellular (WST-1), will also determine the amount of product. Additionally, proof has been provided as to the spontaneous MTT reduction in lipidic cellular compartments/structures, without enzymatic catalysis involved. Nevertheless, even under this alternative paradigm, MTT assay still assesses the reduction potential of a cell (i.e. availability of reducing compounds to drive cellular energetics). As such, the final cell viability interpretation remains unchanged.

In studying the viability of cells seeded on 3D fibrous scaffolds, the thickness of the scaffolds may influence the MTT assay results.

== Observation ==
The optical density (OD) at 550 nm is used to calculate the percentage of viability results using the following equation:

Viability % = 100 × OD550e / OD550b

where:

- OD550e = Mean value of the measured optical density of the test item
- OD550b = Mean value of the measured optical density of the negative control

== See also ==
- Tetrazolium chloride
- Formazan
