= CASY cell counting technology =

Cell counting system

CASY technology is an electric field multi-channel cell counting system. It was first marketed by Schärfe System GmbH in 1987 under the name CASY1. The first systems were sold with an ATARI computer and a rectangular chassis. In the 1990s the ATARI computer was replaced by a common PC and the chassis changed to cylinders. In 2006, Schärfe System was acquired by Innovatis AG, a company focused on cell culture analysis. CASY utilizes the techniques of electric current exclusion and pulse area analysis, the cells can be analyzed and counted in an efficient and precise manner. This technology can be applied for cell counting, cell culture analysis at a certain time interval, or even a period of time.

== Principle of CASY technology ==
Cell viability can be assessed based on the integrity of plasma membrane: the living cells have intact plasma membranes whereas membranes of dead cells are broken. When a cell is exposed to a low voltage field, the electric current cannot go through the intact membrane, which is an electric insulator, if it is viable. Otherwise, as the cellular membrane is broken, electric field can go through the injured cell as there are pores on their membrane. For a normal cell, its size cannot be smaller than its nuclear size, which is the criterion to distinguish between living cells and dead cells.

As a result, when cells in an electrolyte or a particular buffer, they are aligned one by one to a precision measuring pore and exposed to the electric field, each of their information can be captured and the culture condition, including its concentration, viability and volume, can be analyzed. For example, when the living cells get greater volume and pass through the current flow, a greater pulse, in amp-1, can be generated and then amplified. As the cell size is related to the cell volume, a cell size profile in cell population can be produced in terms of pulse height. Since the cells are scanned at such high frequency, a precise result and a high resolution can be produced.

These results from each cell are cumulated and assigned in a calibrated multi-channel analyser with over 500,000 channels. So, for the CASY technology, as the cell flow cytometry, it can present data of each cell as a cell size distribution graph, which has 2 variables, the change in cell volume and that in cell viability. The materials passing through the apparatus can be gated. For the newly invented equipment, they have an automatically lower threshold at 7 um, which can exclude small particles and cell debris in the cell culture. At the same time, there will be an upper threshold to prevent from cell aggregation for counting. However, some of users may set upper threshold to unlimited for cell size. Since the cell size of each cell type is varied, before doing gating, it should ensure the correct cell size is included during the cell size related experiment.

== Advantages ==
Since the cell viability is determined by electric current exclusion, viability dyes such as Trypan blue and Propidium iodide are not needed. Hence, cell viability determination need no longer be a terminal experiment. This advantage permits subsequent tests using the cells such as viability after a further time interval.

The given result will be very accurate because not only are all steps performed robotically, but are high throughput (e.g. a million events/second).

CASY technology it is fast but also reliable and reproducible because of features such as the multi-channel analyzer for detecting and analyzing the pulse height generation. In fact, a channel means the pulse counted in a particular energy. In the past, single channel analyzers were used the instruments. They can count the pulse in a narrow range only. So, they can analyze the cells for one or few times at the set frequency only. Once the electric current is changed during the cell transfer, it could not be detected. This can use not only a much time for analysis but also inaccurate cell counting result. However, for the multi- channel analyzer, it can scan the entire energy range and the pulses in each channel. As there are more than 500,000 channels for a cell counting, once a cell is pass through the measuring pore, there would be a lot of channel monitoring for 1 cell. As a result, the speed of CASY technology to obtain the information of cells can be very high.

== Applications ==
One of CASY technology applications is electronic cell counter for determining cell number and their viability in a sample.

Lindl et al. (2005) compared the CASY technology to two standard methods for cell viability measurement, including the neutral red uptake and MTT assay. They found that the most sensitive IC50 values, which were the closest to those in the literature, were performed by this electronic cell counter. Some toxicants in these experiments by using chemical methods would affect the mechanisms of the assays. So, the results would become invalid. However, for the electronic cell counter, it can not only monitor all the cells changes, even the cell necrosis, by various toxicants types and concentration, but also a complex mixture of toxicants in the cell culture. It would be seen that the progress changes of dying cells can be detected as well. On the other hand, all the results from electric cell counter could be transferred to the computers with common spreadsheet programs. No other specific software would be set up to every computer to obtain the result.

== Differences between CASY and Coulter cell counting ==
A Coulter counter is one of the other devices used for cell counting. Like CASY technology, this also uses electric current for cell counting. However, the difference between them is that there is an aperture called “sensing zone”, with a known volume of electrolyte in a coulter counter. When suspended cells pass through it, they would displace the equivalent volume of electrolyte in the sensing zone and cause a short term change of electric current across the aperture. Since the circuit is to detect the change of current across it, any particles that can displace the electrolyte will be counted. It would be seen that the measurement of cells would be from a volume to another volume in the same sample.

In contrast, the CASY technology incorporates no electrolytic reservoir in the aperture and the cells in the electrolyte can pass through the measuring pore. It would not be necessary to detect the cells from a batch to another batch but measure them continuously and smoothly.
