= Viability assay =

Assay created to determine survival of organs, cells, or tissues

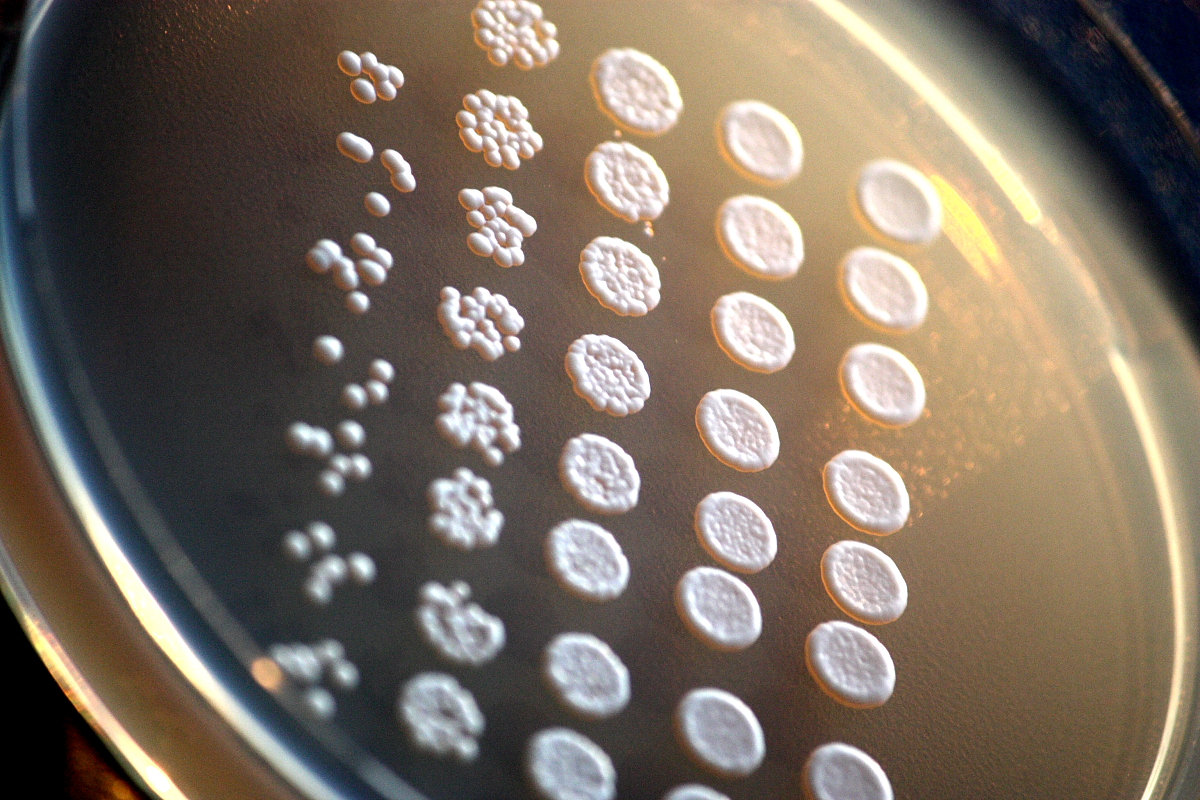
This plated viability assay measures various yeast viability though a method called "frogging". The research is completed through drop-inoculation techniques. Research has since been conducted on "tadpoling", which is a variation of "frogging" that is completed by keeping the test cells diluted in liquid throughout their examination.

A viability assay is an assay that is created to determine the ability of organs, cells or tissues to maintain or recover a state of survival. Viability can be distinguished from the all-or-nothing states of life and death by the use of a quantifiable index that ranges between the integers of 0 and 1 or, if more easily understood, the range of 0% and 100%. Viability can be observed through the physical properties of cells, tissues, and organs. Some of these include mechanical activity, motility, such as with spermatozoa and granulocytes, the contraction of muscle tissue or cells, mitotic activity in cellular functions, and more. Viability assays provide a more precise basis for measurement of an organism's level of vitality.

Viability assays can lead to more findings than the difference of living versus nonliving. These techniques can be used to assess the success of cell culture techniques, cryopreservation techniques, the toxicity of substances, or the effectiveness of substances in mitigating effects of toxic substances.

== Common methods ==
Though simple visual techniques of observing viability can be useful, it can be difficult to thoroughly measure an organism's/part of an organism's viability merely using the observation of physical properties. However, there are a variety of common protocols utilized for further observation of viability using assays.

- Tetrazolium reduction: One useful way to locate and measure viability is to complete a Tetrazolium Reduction Assay. The tetrazolium aspect of this assay, which utilizes both positive and negative charges in its formula, promotes the distinction of cell viability in a specimen.
- Resazurin reduction: Resazurin Reduction Assays perform very closely to that of a tetrazolium assay, except they use the power of redox to fuel their ability to represent cell viability.
- Protease viability marker: One can look at protease function in specimens if they wish to target viability in cells; this practice in research is known as "Protease Viability Marker Assay Concept". The actions of protease cease once a cell dies, so a clear-cut line is drawn in determining cell viability when using this technique.
- ATP:ATP is a common energy molecule that many researchers hold extensive knowledge of, thus carrying over to how one understands viability assays. The ATP Assay Concept is a well-known technique for determining the viability of cells using the assessment of ATP and a method known as "firefly luciferase".
- Sodium-potassium ratio: Another kind of assay practices the examination of the ratio of potassium to sodium in cells to serve as an index of viability. If the cells do not have high intracellular potassium and if intracellular sodium is low, then (1) the cell membrane may not be intact, and/or (2) the sodium-potassium pump may not be operating well.

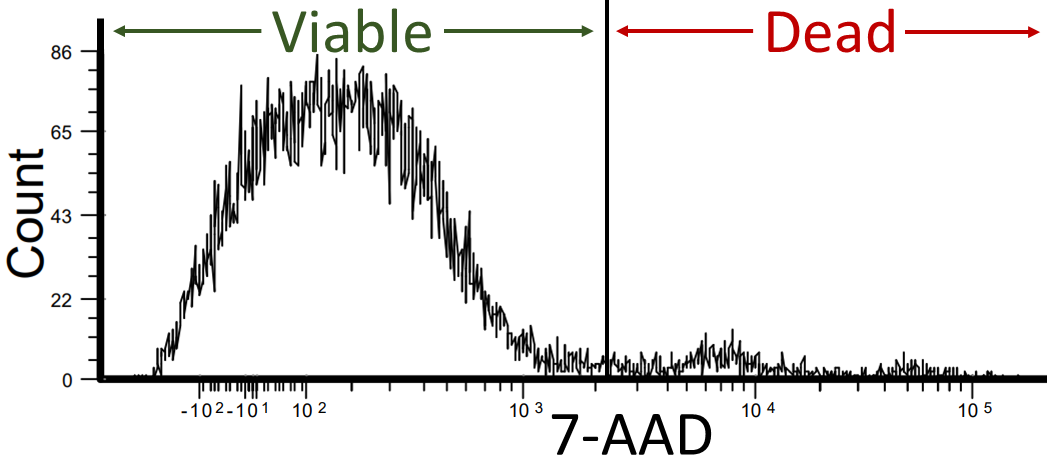
Flow cytometry using 7-Aminoactinomycin D (7-AAD), wherein a lower signal indicates viable cells. Therefore, this case shows good viability (viability of the cells in flow cytometry should be around 95% but not less than 90%.).

- Cytolysis or membrane leakage: This category includes the lactate dehydrogenase assay. Assays such as these contain a stable enzyme common in all cells that can be readily detected when cell membranes are no longer intact. Examples of this type of assay include propidium iodide, trypan blue, and 7-Aminoactinomycin D (7-AAD).
- Mitochondrial activity or caspase: Resazurin and Formazan (MTT/XTT) can assay for various stages in the apoptosis process that foreshadows cell death.
- Functional: Assays of cell function will be highly specific to the types of cells being assayed. For example, motility is a widely used assay of sperm cell function. Gamete survival can generally be used to assay fertility. Red blood cells have been assayed in terms of deformability, osmotic fragility, hemolysis, ATP level, and hemoglobin content. For transplantable whole organs, the ultimate assay is the ability to sustain life after transplantation, an assay which is not helpful in preventing transplantation of non-functional organs.
- Genomic and proteomic: Cells can be assayed for activation of stress pathways using DNA microarrays and protein chips.
- Flow Cytometry: Automation allows for analysis of thousands of cells per second.

As with many kinds of viability assays, quantitative measures of physiological function do not indicate whether damage repair and recovery is possible. An assay of the ability of a cell line to adhere and divide may be more indicative of incipient damage than membrane integrity.

=== Frogging and tadpoling ===
"Frogging" is a type of viability assay method that utilizes an agar plate for its environment and consists of plating serial dilutions by pinning them after they have been diluted in liquid. Some of its limitations include that it does not account for total viability and it is not particularly sensitive to low-viability assays; however, it is known for its quick pace. "Tadpoling", which is a method practiced after the development of "frogging", is similar to the "frogging" method, but its test cells are diluted in liquid and then kept in liquid through the examination process. The "tadpoling" method can be used to measure culture viability accurately, which is what depicts its main separation from "frogging".

== List of viability assay methods ==
- Calcein AM
- Clonogenic assay
- Ethidium homodimer assay
- Evans blue
- Fluorescein diacetate hydrolysis/Propidium iodide staining (FDA/PI staining)
- Flow cytometry
- Formazan-based assays (MTT/XTT)
- Green fluorescent protein
- Lactate dehydrogenase (LDH)
- Methyl violet
- Neutral red uptake (vital stain)
- Propidium iodide, DNA stain that can differentiate necrotic, apoptotic and normal cells.
- Resazurin
- TUNEL assay

== See also ==
- Cytotoxicity
- Vital stain
