= Casy =

Casy may refer to:

== People ==
- Joseph Grégoire Casy (1787–1862), French naval officer and politician

== Places ==
- Časy, Czech Republic
- Casy Island, Antarctica

== Other ==
- CASY cell counting technology
- CASY, NASDAQ code of Casey's
- Jim Casy, character in The Grapes of Wrath
