= Cell counting =

Measurement of cell concentration

Cell counting is any of various methods for the counting or similar quantification of cells in the life sciences, including medical diagnosis and treatment. It is an important subset of cytometry, with applications in research and clinical practice. For example, the complete blood count can help a physician to determine why a patient feels unwell and what to do to help. Cell counts within liquid media (such as blood, plasma, lymph, or laboratory rinsate) are usually expressed as a number of cells per unit of volume, thus expressing a concentration (for example, 5,000 cells per milliliter).

== Uses ==
Numerous procedures in biology and medicine require the counting of cells. By the counting of cells in a known small volume, the concentration can be mediated. Examples of the need for cell counting include:

- In medicine, the concentration of various blood cells, such as red blood cells and white blood cells, can give crucial information regarding the health situation of a person (see: complete blood count).
- In cell therapy, to control the dose of cells administered to a patient.
- Similarly, the concentration of bacteria, viruses and other pathogens in the blood or in other bodily fluids can reveal information about the progress of an infectious disease and about the degree of success with which the immune system is dealing with the infection.
- The cell concentration needs to be known for many experiments in molecular biology, in order to adjust accordingly the amount of reagents and chemicals that are to be applied in the experiment.
- Studies that examine the growth rate of microorganisms (in other words, how fast they divide to create new cells) require cell counting.
- Calculating the fraction of dead to live cells as a measure of cell viability, such as of cells exposed to poison.

== Manual cell counting ==
There are several methods for cell counting. Some are primitive and do not require special equipment, thus can be done in any biological laboratory, whereas others rely on sophisticated electronic appliances.

=== Counting chamber ===
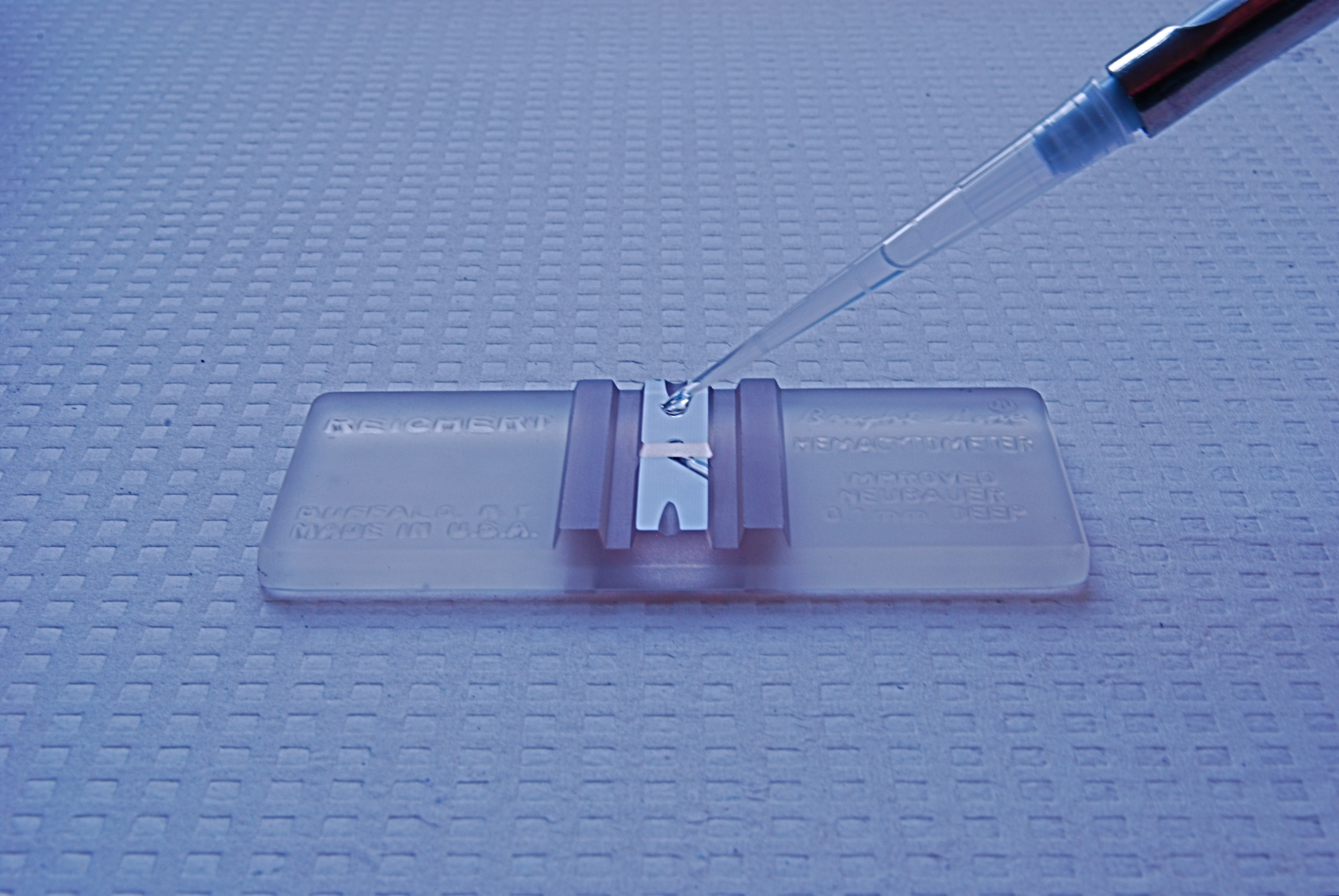
A counting chamber

A counting chamber, is a microscope slide that is especially designed to enable cell counting. Hemocytometers and Sedgewick Rafter counting chambers are two types of counting chambers. The hemocytometer has two gridded chambers in its middle, which are covered with a special glass slide when counting. A drop of cell culture is placed in the space between the chamber and the glass cover, filling it via capillary action. Looking at the sample under the microscope, the researcher uses the grid to manually count the number of cells in a certain area of known size. The separating distance between the chamber and the cover is predefined, thus the volume of the counted culture can be calculated and with it the concentration of cells. Cell viability can also be determined if viability dyes are added to the fluid.

Their advantage is being cheap and fast; this makes them the preferred counting method in fast biological experiments where it is only necessary to determine if a cell culture has grown as expected. Usually the culture examined needs to be diluted, otherwise the high density of cells would make counting impossible. The need for dilution is a disadvantage as every dilution adds inaccuracy to the measurement.

=== Plating and CFU counting ===
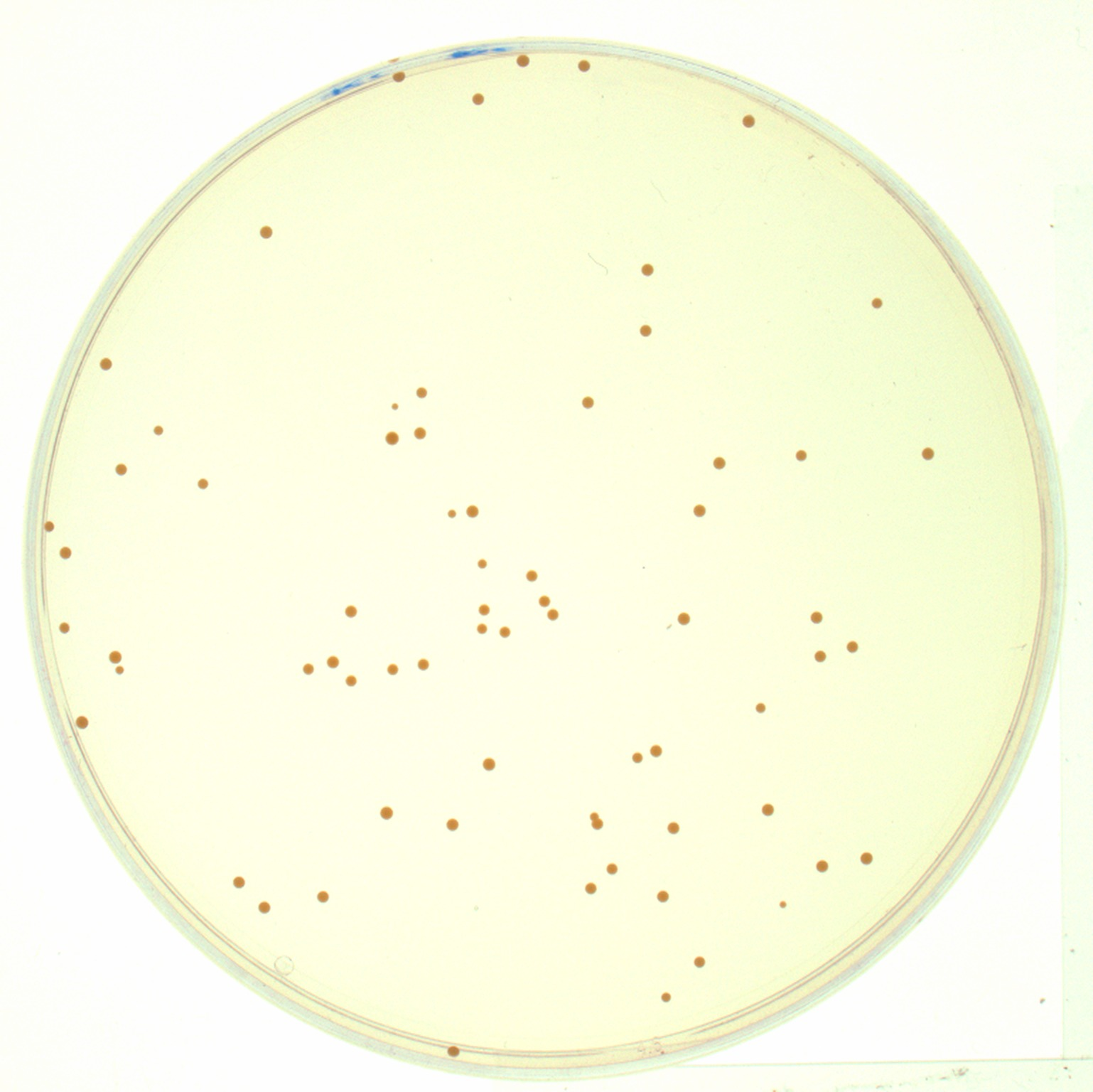
A picture of Staphylococcus aureus colonies growing on an agar plate (photographed in transmitted light). Such homogeneously spread colonies are suitable for CFU enumeration.

To quantify the number of cells in a culture, the cells can be simply plated on a petri dish with growth medium. If the cells are efficiently distributed on the plate, it can be generally assumed that each cell will give rise to a single colony or Colony Forming Unit (CFU). The colonies can then be counted, and based on the known volume of culture that was spread on the plate, the cell concentration can be calculated. This is often carried out following the ASTM D5465 standard.

As is with counting chambers, cultures usually need to be heavily diluted prior to plating; otherwise, instead of obtaining single colonies that can be counted, a so-called "lawn" will form: thousands of colonies lying over each other. Additionally, plating is the slowest method of all: most microorganisms need at least 12 hours to form visible colonies.

Although this method can be time-consuming, it gives an accurate estimate of the number of viable cells (because only they will be able to grow and form visible colonies). It is therefore extensively used in experiments aiming to quantify the number of cells resisting drugs or other external conditions (for instance the Luria–Delbrück experiment or the gentamicin protection assay). In addition, the enumeration of colonies on agar plates can be greatly facilitated by using colony counters.

== Automated Cell Counting ==
=== Electrical resistance ===
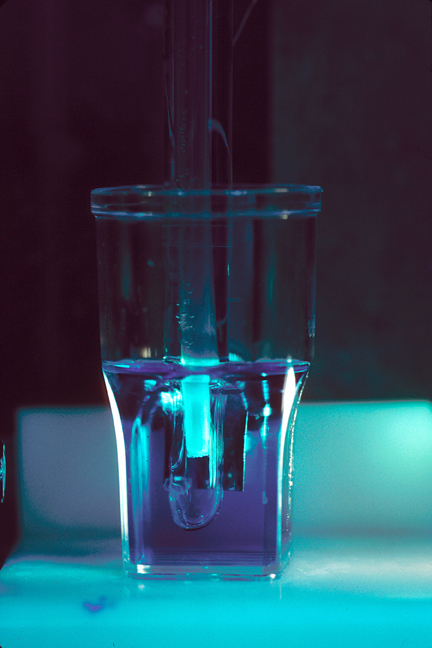
The electrode of a Coulter counter

A Coulter counter is an appliance that can count cells as well as measure their volume. It is based on the fact that cells show great electrical resistance; in other words, they conduct almost no electricity. In a Coulter counter the cells, swimming in a solution that conducts electricity, are sucked one by one into a tiny gap. Flanking the gap are two electrodes that conduct electricity. When no cell is in the gap, electricity flows unabated, but when a cell is sucked into the gap the current is resisted. The Coulter counter counts the number of such events and also measures the current (and hence the resistance), which directly correlates to the volume of the cell trapped. A similar system is the CASY cell counting technology.

Coulter and CASY counters are much cheaper than flow cytometers, and for applications that require cell numbers and sizes, such as cell-cycle research, they are the method of choice. Its advantage over the methods above is the large number of cells that can be processed in a short time, namely: thousands of cells per second. This offers great accuracy and statistical significance.

=== Flow cytometry ===
Flow cytometry is by far the most sophisticated and expensive method for cell counting. In a flow cytometer the cells flow in a narrow stream in front of a laser beam. The beam hits them one by one, and a light detector picks up the light that is reflected from the cells.

Flow cytometers have many other abilities, such as analyzing the shape of cells and their internal and external structures, as well as measuring the amount of specific proteins and other biochemicals in the cells. Therefore, flow cytometers are rarely purchased for the sole purpose of counting cells.

=== Image analysis ===
Recent approaches consider the use of high-quality microscopy images over which a statistical classification algorithm is used to perform automated cell detection and counting as an image analysis task. Generally performs with a constant error rate as an off-line (batch) type process. A range of image classification techniques can be employed for this purpose.

=== Stereologic cell counting ===
At present, stereologic cell counting with manual decision for object inclusion according to unbiased stereologic counting rules remains the only adequate method for unbiased cell quantification in histologic tissue sections, thus it's not adequate enough to be fully automated.

== Indirect Cell Counting ==
=== Spectrophotometry ===
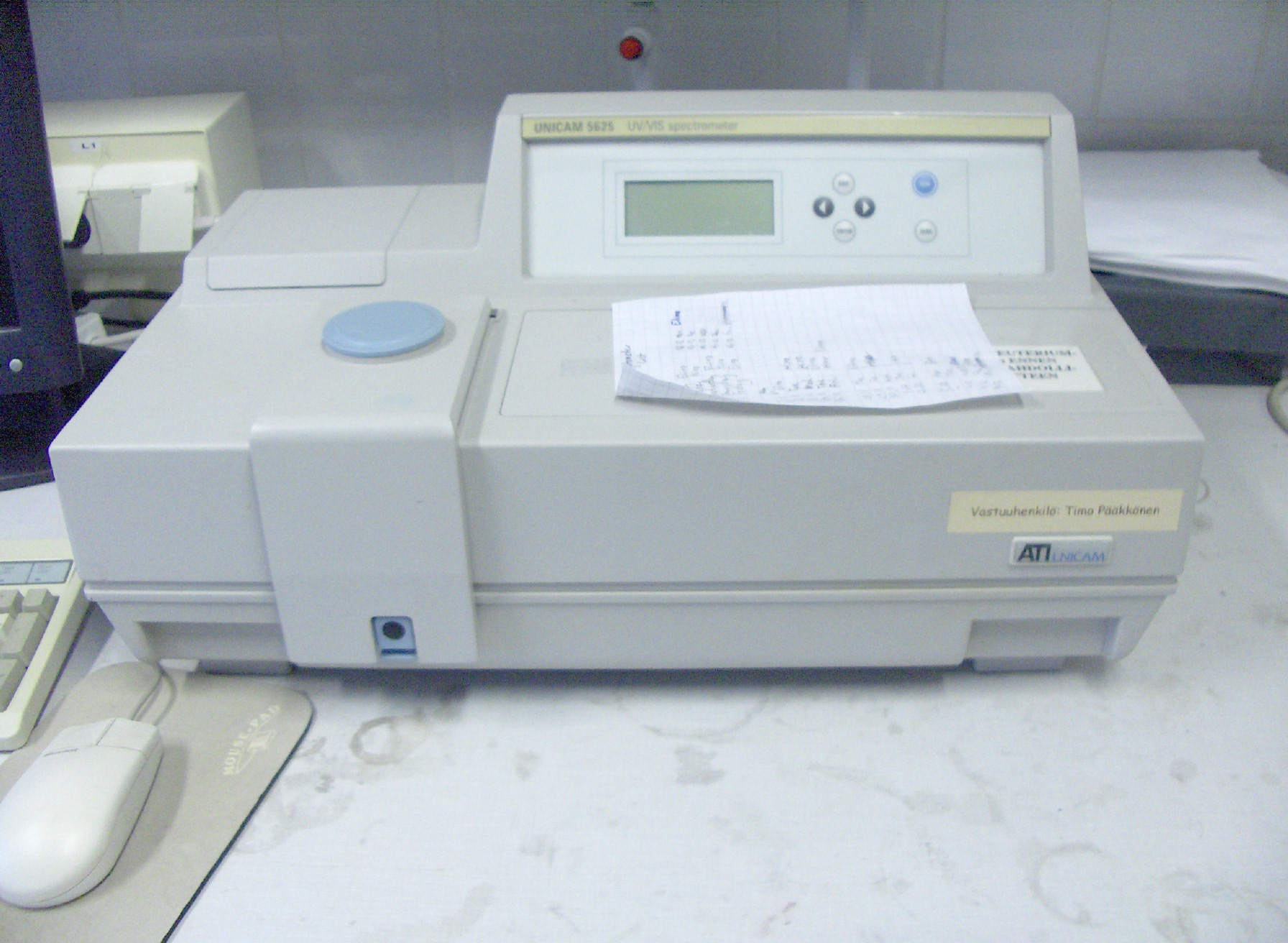
A spectrophotometer

Cell suspensions are turbid. Cells absorb and scatter the light. The higher the cell concentration, the higher the turbidity. Spectrophotometers can measure intensity of light very accurately. The cell culture is placed in a transparent cuvette and the absorption is measured relative to medium alone. Optical density (OD) is directly proportional to the biomass in the cell suspension in a given range that is specific to the cell type. Using spectrophotometry for measuring the turbidity of cultures is known as turbidometry.

This has made spectrophotometry the methods of choice for measurements of bacterial growth and related applications. Spectrophotometry's drawback is its inability to provide an absolute count or distinguish between living and dead cells.

=== Impedance microbiology ===
Impedance microbiology is a rapid microbiological technique used to measure the microbial concentration (mainly bacteria but also yeasts) of a sample by monitoring the electrical parameters of the growth medium. It is based on the fact that bacteria metabolism transforms uncharged (or weakly charged) compounds into highly charged compounds thus changing the growth medium electrical properties. The microbial concentration is estimated on the time required for the monitored electrical parameters to deviate from the initial baseline value.

Different instruments (either built in a laboratory or commercially available) to measure the bacterial concentration using Impedance Microbiology are available.
