= Fluorescein diacetate hydrolysis =

Fluorescein diacetate (FDA) hydrolysis assays can be used to measure the enzyme activity of microbes in a sample. A bright yellow-green glow is produced and is strongest when enzymatic activity is greatest. This can be quantified using a spectrofluorometer or a spectrophotometer.

== Applications ==
FDA hydrolysis is often used to measure activity in soil and compost samples; however, it may not give an accurate reading if microbes with lower activity phases, such as esterases, cleave the fluorescein first.

It is also used in combination with propidium iodide (PI) to determine viability in eukaryotic cells. Living cells will actively convert the non-fluorescent FDA into the green fluorescent compound fluorescein, a sign of viability; while nucleus of membrane-compromised cells will fluoresce red, a sign of cell death. Currently FDA/PI staining is the standard assessment of human pancreatic islet viability with suitability for transplantation when viability score is above 70%.

== Preparation ==
FDA stock solution is prepared by dissolving 5 mg of fluorescein diacetate in 1 ml acetone, and sucrose may be added for live cell viability testing. FDA stain must be kept in the dark at 4°C or it will spoil.
