= Evans blue =

Evans blue may refer to:

- Evans blue (dye)
- Evans Blue, Canadian rock band
