= EuroFlow =

Medical science consortium

EuroFlow consortium was founded in 2005 as 2U-FP6 funded project and launched in spring 2006. At first, EuroFlow was composed of 18 diagnostic research groups and two SMEs (small/medium enterprises) from eight different European countries with complementary knowledge and skills in the field of flow cytometry and immunophenotyping. During 2012 both SMEs left the project so it obtained full scientific independence. The goal of EuroFlow consortium is to innovate and standardize flow cytometry leading to global improvement and progress in diagnostics of haematological malignancies and individualisation of treatment.

== Background ==
Since the '90s immunophenotyping (staining cells with antibodies conjugated with fluorochromes and detection with flow cytometer) became the preferred method in diagnostics of haematological malignancies. The advantages of this method are speed and simplicity, possibility to measure more than 6 parameters at a time, precise focusing on malignant population and also broad applicability in diagnostics. Because there is a great progress in development of antibodies, fluorochromes and multicolor digital flow cytometers, it became a question of how to interpret cytometric data and how to achieve comparable results between facilities. Even though a consensus of recommendations and guidelines was established, standardization was only partial because there was no regard of different antibody clones, fluorochromes and their optimal combinations or of sample preparation. On that account cytometry is perceived as method highly dependent on level of expertise and with limited reproducibility in multicentric studies.

== Goals of Euroflow ==
These goals were set out in the journal Leukemia in 2012.

- Development and evaluation of new antibodies
- Establishment of new immunobead assay technology
- Development of new software tools followed by new analysing approaches for recognition of complex immunophenotype patterns.
- Design of new multicolor protocols and standard operating procedures (SOPs)
- Development and standardization of fast, accurate and highly sensitive flow cytometry

== Achievements ==
During passed few years EuroFlow achieved most of its goals. Eight-color panels for diagnoses, and classification and follow-up of haematological malignancies were established. Panels, consisting of screening tube and supplementary characterisation tubes, are based on experiences and knowledge from literature but further optimised and tested in multiple research centers on large collection of samples impeaching on selection of fluorochromes and standardization of instrument settings and SOPs. Antibody clones, fluorochromes and other reagencies from different companies underwent detailed testing and comparison. Simultaneously a new software for analysing of more complex and extensive data files was developed, capable of multidimensional statistical comparison of normal data samples and patient samples. Also new antibody clones against rigorously selected epitopes of proteins involved in chromosomal translocations were developed for detection of most frequent fusion proteins in acute leukemia and chronic myeloid leukemia. Also detection of fusion proteins using immunobead assays was introduced.
