= Vital stain =

Stain that doesn't kill living cells when applied

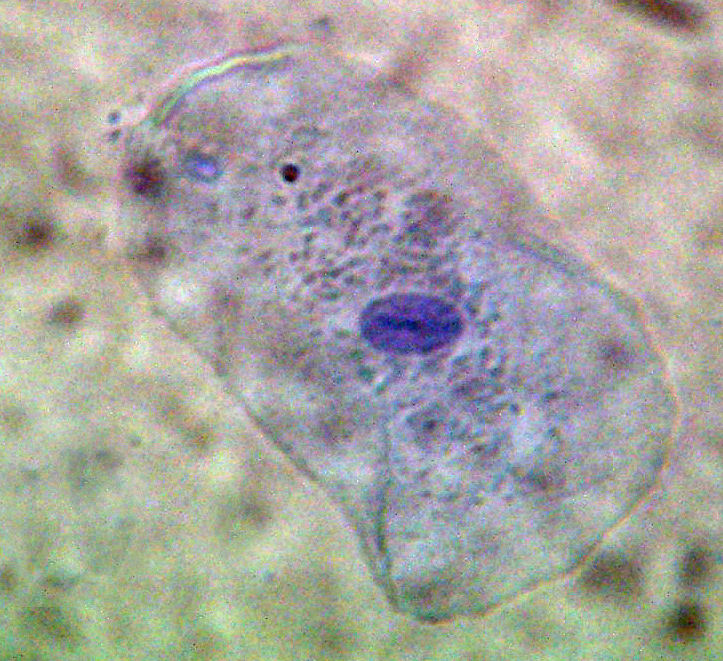
Human oral mucosa stained with methylene blue

A vital stain in a casual usage may mean a stain that can be applied on living cells without killing them. Vital stains have been useful for diagnostic and surgical techniques in a variety of medical specialties. In supravital staining, living cells have been removed from an organism, whereas intravital staining is done by injecting or otherwise introducing the stain into the body. The term vital stain is used by some authors to refer to an intravital stain, and by others interchangeably with a supravital stain, the core concept being that the cell being examined is still alive. In a more strict sense, the term vital staining has a meaning contrasting with supravital staining. While in supravital staining the living cells take up the stain, in "vital staining" – the most accepted but apparently paradoxical meaning of this term, the living cells exclude the stain i.e. stain negatively and only the dead cells stain positively and thus viability can be assessed by counting the percentage of total cells that stain negatively. Very bulky or highly charged stains that don't cross live plasma membrane are used as vital stains and supravital stains are those that are either small or are pumped actively into live cells. Since supravital and intravital nature of the staining depends on the dye, a combination of supravital and vital dyes can also be used in a sophisticated way to better classify cells into distinct subsets (e.g. viable, dead, dying etc.).

== List of common vital stains ==
- Eosin dye exclusion
- Propidium iodide, DNA stain that can differentiate necrotic, apoptotic and normal cells.
- Trypan Blue, a living-cell exclusion dye
- Triphenyl tetrazolium chloride
- Erythrosine, which is Red No. 3 in food coloring, can be used as an exclusion dye.
- 7-Aminoactinomycin D used e.g. in flowcytometric studies of hematopoietic stem cell viability.
- Other Vital Stains :
  - Janus Green B is a basic dye and vital stain used in histology.

== See also ==
- Cytopathology
- Histology
- Staining
- Viability assay
