= Neutral red =

- Neutral red

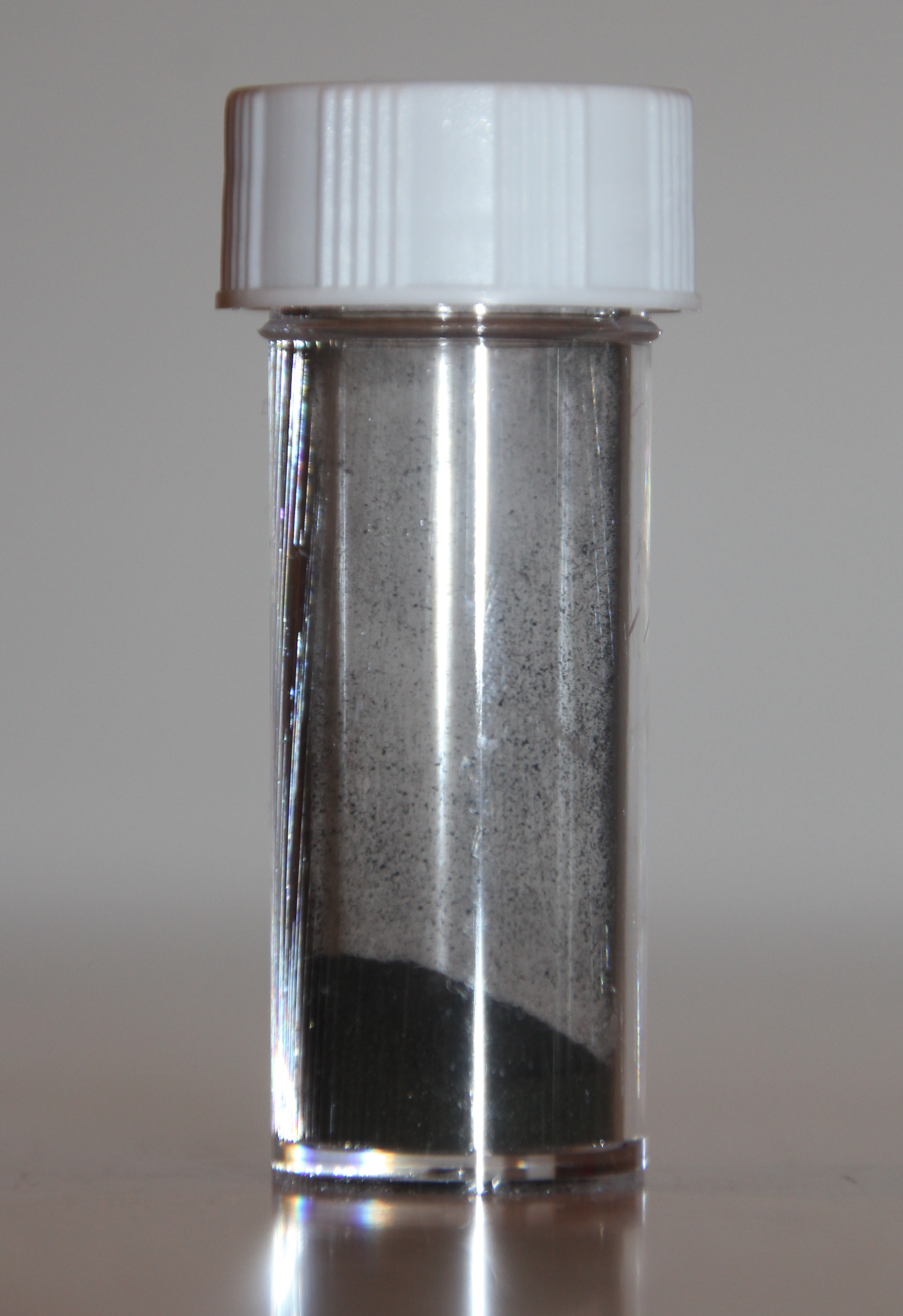
Solid Neutral Red
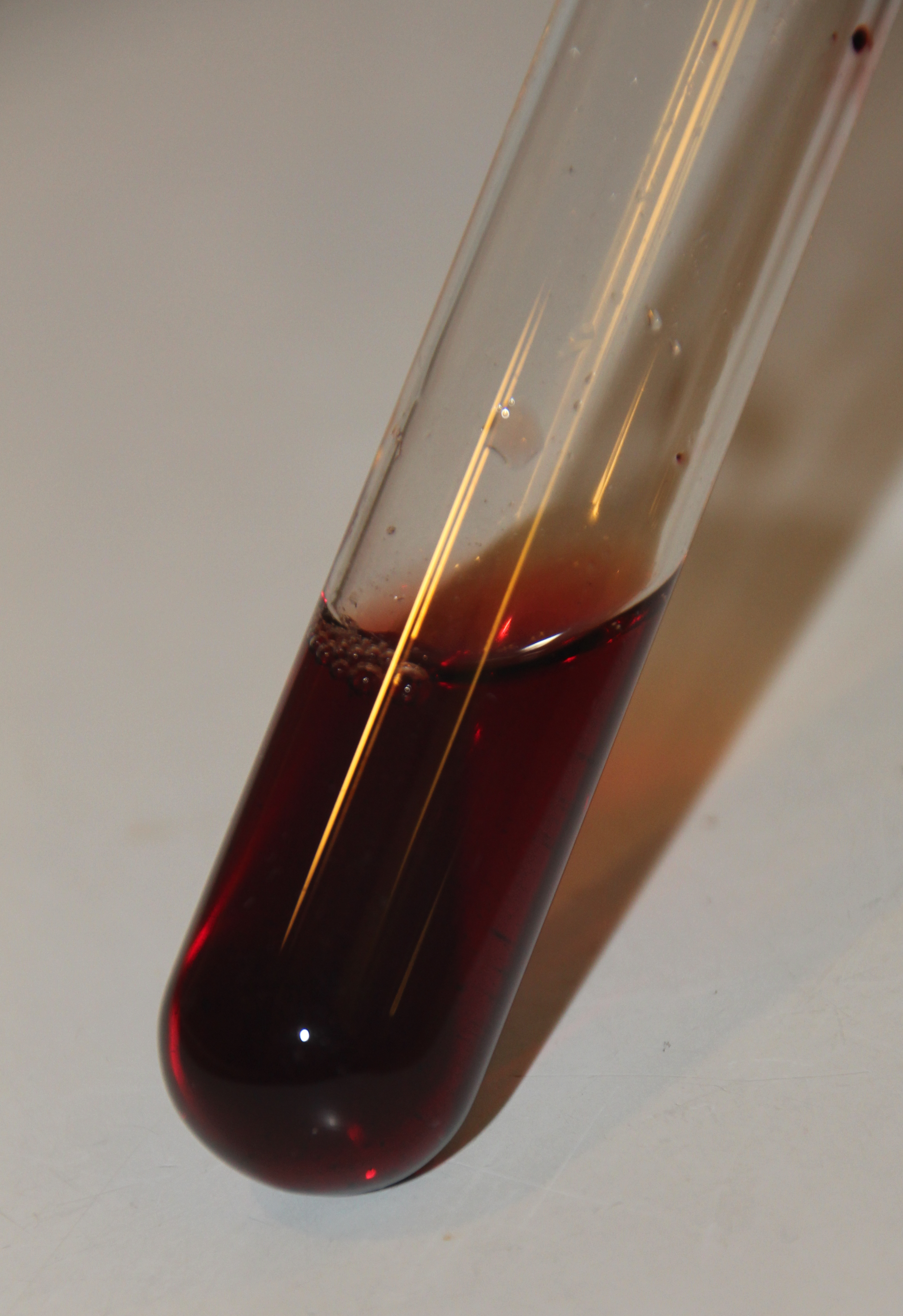
Neutral Red Aqueous Solution

Names
- IUPAC name N^{2},N^{2},7-Trimethylphenazine-2,8-diamine—hydrogen chloride (1/1)
- Other names 3-Amino-7-dimethylamino-2-methylphenazine hydrochloride Toluylene red

Identifiers
CAS Number	553-24-2
3D model (JSmol)	Interactive image
ChEBI	CHEBI:86370
ChemSpider	10634
ECHA InfoCard	100.008.215
EC Number	209-035-8
PubChem CID	11105
UNII	261QK3SSBH
CompTox Dashboard (EPA)	DTXSID90883440
- InChI: InChI=1S/C15H16N4.ClH/c1-9-6-13-15(8-11(9)16)18-14-7-10(19(2)3)4-5-12(14)17-13;/h4-8H,16H2,1-3H3;1H Key: PGSADBUBUOPOJS-UHFFFAOYSA-N; InChI=1/C15H16N4.ClH/c1-9-6-13-15(8-11(9)16)18-14-7-10(19(2)3)4-5-12(14)17-13;/h4-8H,16H2,1-3H3;1H Key: PGSADBUBUOPOJS-UHFFFAOYAB
- SMILES: Cl.n1c3c(nc2c1cc(c(c2)N)C)cc(N(C)C)cc3

Properties
Chemical formula	C_{15}H_{17}N_{4}
Molar mass	288.78 g/mol
Melting point	290 °C (554 °F; 563 K)

Hazards
- GHS labelling
Pictograms	(GHS06: Toxic) (GHS07: Exclamation mark) (GHS08: Health hazard)
Signal word	Danger
Hazard statements	H301, H315, H319, H335, H341
Precautionary statements	P201, P202, P261, P264, P270, P271, P280, P281, P301+P310, P302+P352, P304+P340, P305+P351+P338, P308+P313, P312, P321, P330, P332+P313, P337+P313, P362, P403+P233, P405, P501
- Except where otherwise noted, data are given for materials in their standard state (at 25 °C [77 °F], 100 kPa). verify (what is ?) Infobox references

Neutral red (pH indicator)
below pH 6.8		above pH 8.0
(red) 6.8	⇌	8.0 (yellow)

Neutral red (toluylene red, Basic Red 5, or C.I. 50040) is a eurhodin dye used for staining in histology. It stains lysosomes red. It is used as a general stain in histology, as a counterstain in combination with other dyes, and for many staining methods. Together with Janus Green B, it is used to stain embryonal tissues and supravital staining of blood. It can be used for staining the Golgi apparatus in cells and Nissl granules in neurons.

In microbiology, it is used in the MacConkey agar to differentiate bacteria for lactose fermentation.

Neutral red can be used as a vital stain. The Neutral Red Cytotoxicity Assay was first developed by Ellen Borenfreund in 1984. In the Neutral Red Assay live cells incorporate neutral red into their lysosomes. As cells begin to die, their ability to incorporate neutral red diminishes. Thus, loss of neutral red uptake corresponds to loss of cell viability. The neutral red is also used to stain cell cultures for plate titration of viruses.

Neutral red is added to some growth media for bacterial and cell cultures. It usually is available as a monohydrochloride salt.

Neutral red acts as a pH indicator, changing from red to yellow between pH 6.8 and 8.0.

== Other references ==
- Borenfreund, Ellen; Puerner, James A. (1985). "Toxicity determined in vitro by morphological alterations and neutral red absorption". Toxicology Letters. 24 (2–3): 119–124. doi:10.1016/0378-4274(85)90046-3. PMID 3983963.
- Borenfreund, E.; Babich, H.; Martin-Alguacil, N. (1988). "Comparisons of two in vitro cytotoxicity assays—The neutral red (NR) and tetrazolium MTT tests". Toxicology in Vitro. 2 (1): 1–6. doi:10.1016/0887-2333(88)90030-6. PMID 20702351.
