= 7-Aminoactinomycin D =

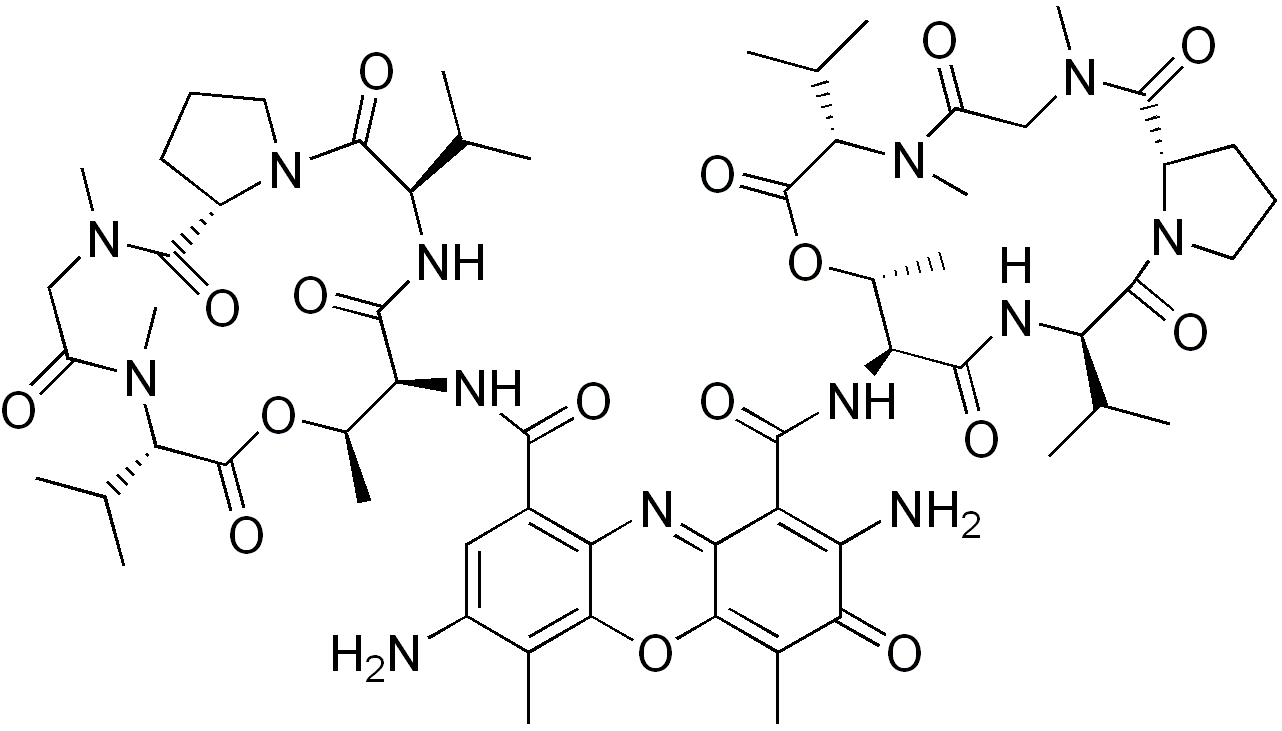

Names
- Other names 7-Amino-actinomycin D

Identifiers
CAS Number	7240-37-1
3D model (JSmol)	Interactive image
Beilstein Reference	5915844
ChEBI	CHEBI:52304
ChemSpider	21326185
ECHA InfoCard	100.163.188
EC Number	635-285-6
PubChem CID	16218991
UNII	DXS32PH95R
CompTox Dashboard (EPA)	DTXSID30903974
- InChI: InChI=1S/C62H87N13O16/c1-26(2)42-59(85)74-21-17-19-36(74)57(83)70(13)24-38(76)72(15)48(28(5)6)61(87)89-32(11)44(55(81)66-42)68-53(79)34-23-35(63)30(9)51-46(34)65-47-40(41(64)50(78)31(10)52(47)91-51)54(80)69-45-33(12)90-62(88)49(29(7)8)73(16)39(77)25-71(14)58(84)37-20-18-22-75(37)60(86)43(27(3)4)67-56(45)82/h23,26-29,32-33,36-37,42-45,48-49H,17-22,24-25,63-64H2,1-16H3,(H,66,81)(H,67,82)(H,68,79)(H,69,80)/t32-,33-,36+,37+,42-,43-,44+,45+,48+,49+/m1/s1 Key: YXHLJMWYDTXDHS-IRFLANFNSA-N; InChI=1/C62H87N13O16/c1-26(2)42-59(85)74-21-17-19-36(74)57(83)70(13)24-38(76)72(15)48(28(5)6)61(87)89-32(11)44(55(81)66-42)68-53(79)34-23-35(63)30(9)51-46(34)65-47-40(41(64)50(78)31(10)52(47)91-51)54(80)69-45-33(12)90-62(88)49(29(7)8)73(16)39(77)25-71(14)58(84)37-20-18-22-75(37)60(86)43(27(3)4)67-56(45)82/h23,26-29,32-33,36-37,42-45,48-49H,17-22,24-25,63-64H2,1-16H3,(H,66,81)(H,67,82)(H,68,79)(H,69,80)/t32-,33-,36+,37+,42-,43-,44+,45+,48+,49+/m1/s1 Key: YXHLJMWYDTXDHS-IRFLANFNBD
- SMILES: O=C3C(C)=C2OC1=C(C)C(N)=CC(C(N[C@H](C(N[C@@H](C7=O)[C@H](C)C)=O)[C@@H](C)OC([C@H]([C@H](C)C)N(C)C(CN(C)[C@]([C@H]6N7CCC6)=O)=O)=O)=O)=C1N=C2C(C(N[C@H](C(N[C@H]([C@H](C)C)C4=O)=O)[C@@H](C)OC([C@H]([C@@H](C)C)N(C)C(CN(C)[C@@]([C@H]5N4CCC5)=O)=O)=O)=O)=C3N

Properties
Chemical formula	C_{62}H_{87}N_{13}O_{16}
Molar mass	1270.43 g/mol
Appearance	Red to dark purple powder

Hazards
- GHS labelling
Pictograms	(GHS06: Toxic) (GHS08: Health hazard)
Signal word	Danger
Hazard statements	H300, H310, H315, H319, H330, H335, H350, H360
Precautionary statements	P201, P202, P260, P262, P264, P270, P271, P280, P281, P284, P301+P310, P302+P350, P302+P352, P304+P340, P305+P351+P338, P308+P313, P310, P312, P320, P321, P330, P332+P313, P337+P313, P361, P362, P363, P403+P233, P405, P501
- Except where otherwise noted, data are given for materials in their standard state (at 25 °C [77 °F], 100 kPa). verify (what is ?) Infobox references

7-Aminoactinomycin D (7-AAD) is a fluorescent chemical compound with a strong affinity for DNA. It is used as a fluorescent marker for DNA in fluorescence microscopy and flow cytometry. It intercalates in double-stranded DNA, with a high affinity for GC-rich regions, making it useful for chromosome banding studies.

== Applications ==
With an absorption maximum at 546 nm, 7-AAD is efficiently excited using a 543 nm helium–neon laser; it can also be excited with somewhat lower efficiency using a 488 nm or 514 nm argon laser lines. Its emission has a very large Stokes shift with a maximum in the deep red: 647 nm. 7-AAD is therefore compatible with most blue and green fluorophores – and even many red fluorophores – in multicolour applications.

7-AAD does not readily pass through intact cell membranes; if it is to be used as a stain for imaging DNA fluorescence, the cell membrane must be permeabilized or disrupted. This method can be used in combination with formaldehyde fixation of samples.

7-AAD is also used as a cell viability stain. Cells with compromised membranes will stain with 7-AAD, while live cells with intact cell membranes will remain dark. Viability of the cells in flow cytometry should be around 95% but not less than 90%.

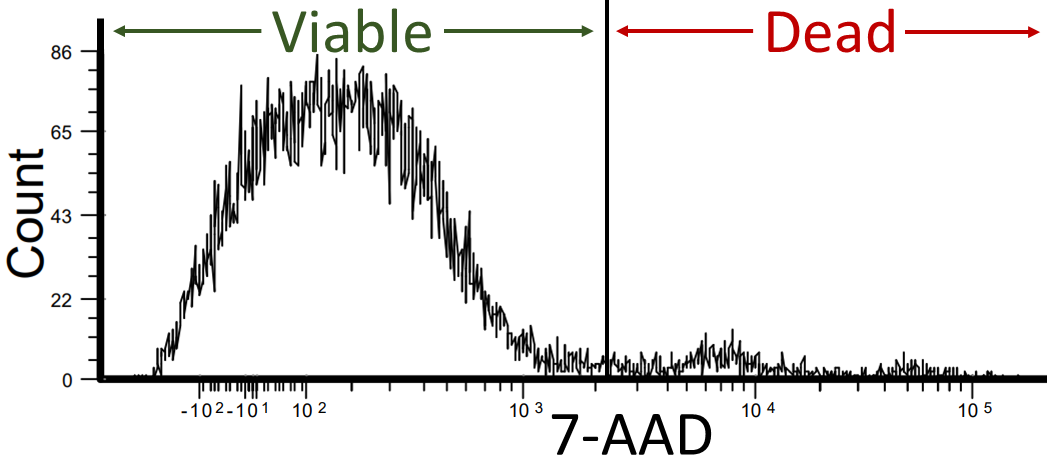
Flow cytometry using 7-AAD, wherein a lower signal indicates viable cells. Therefore, this case shows good viability.

== Actinomycin D ==
The related compound actinomycin D is nonfluorescent, but binds DNA in the same way as 7-AAD. Its absorbance changes when bound to DNA, and it can be used as a stain in conventional transmission microscopy.

== Gallery ==
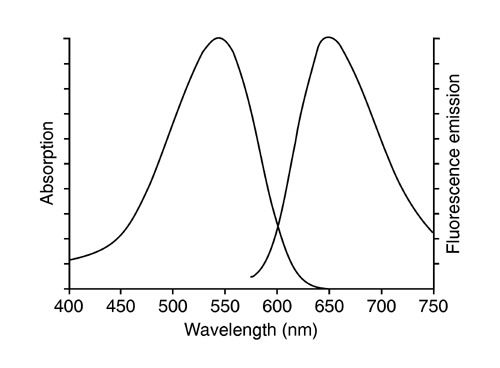
Absorptions
