= Janus Green B =

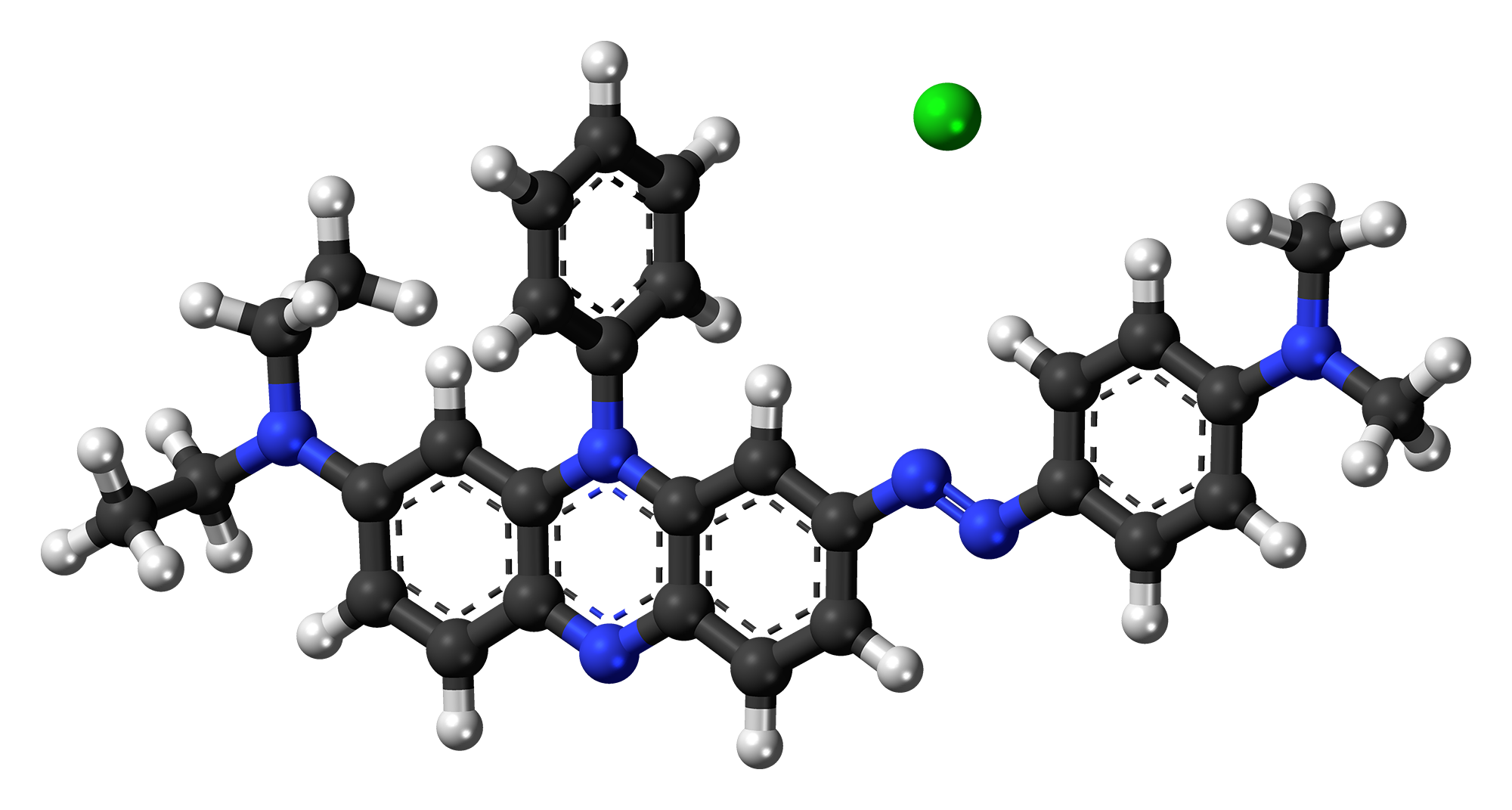

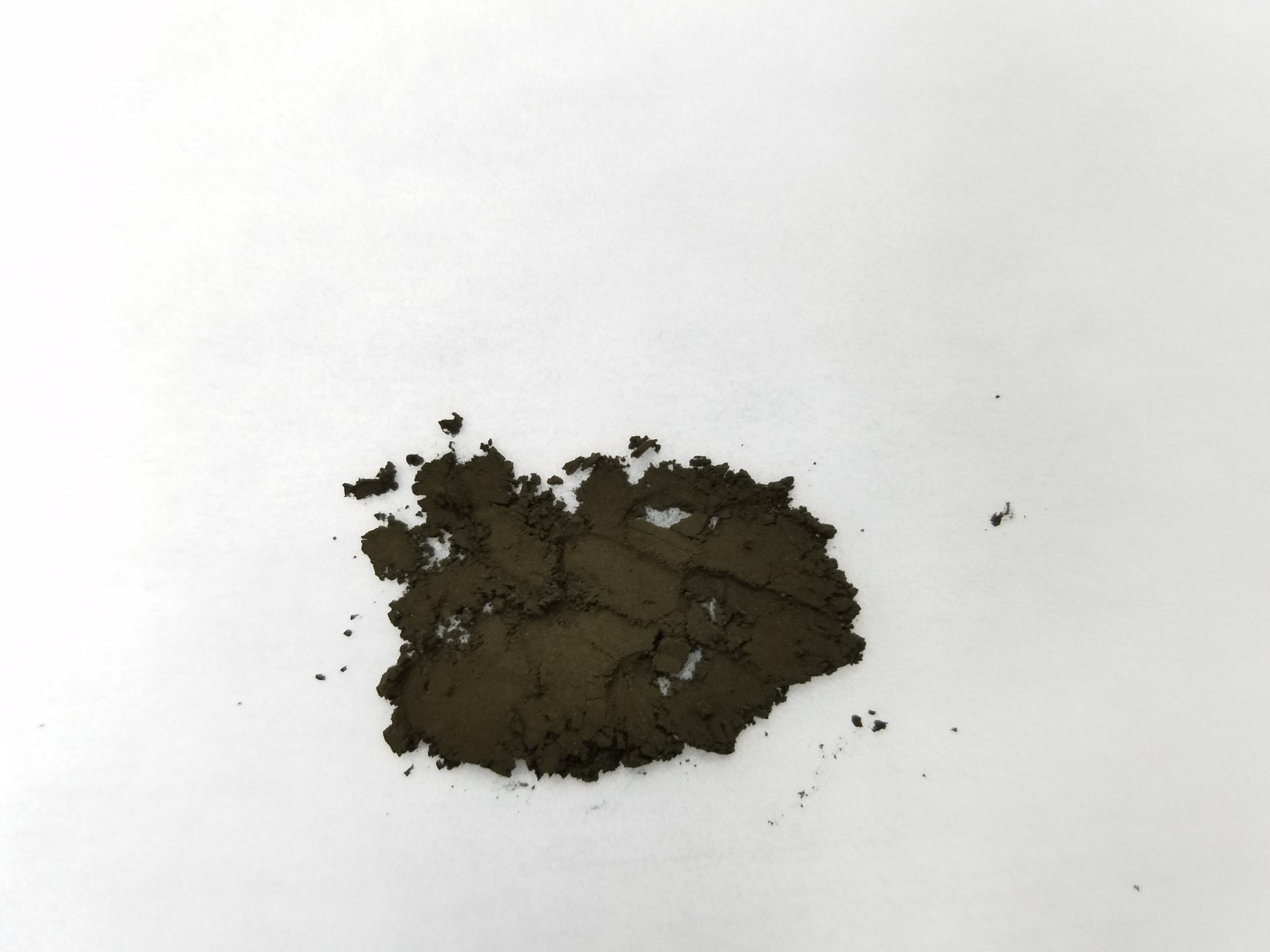
Solid Janus Green B
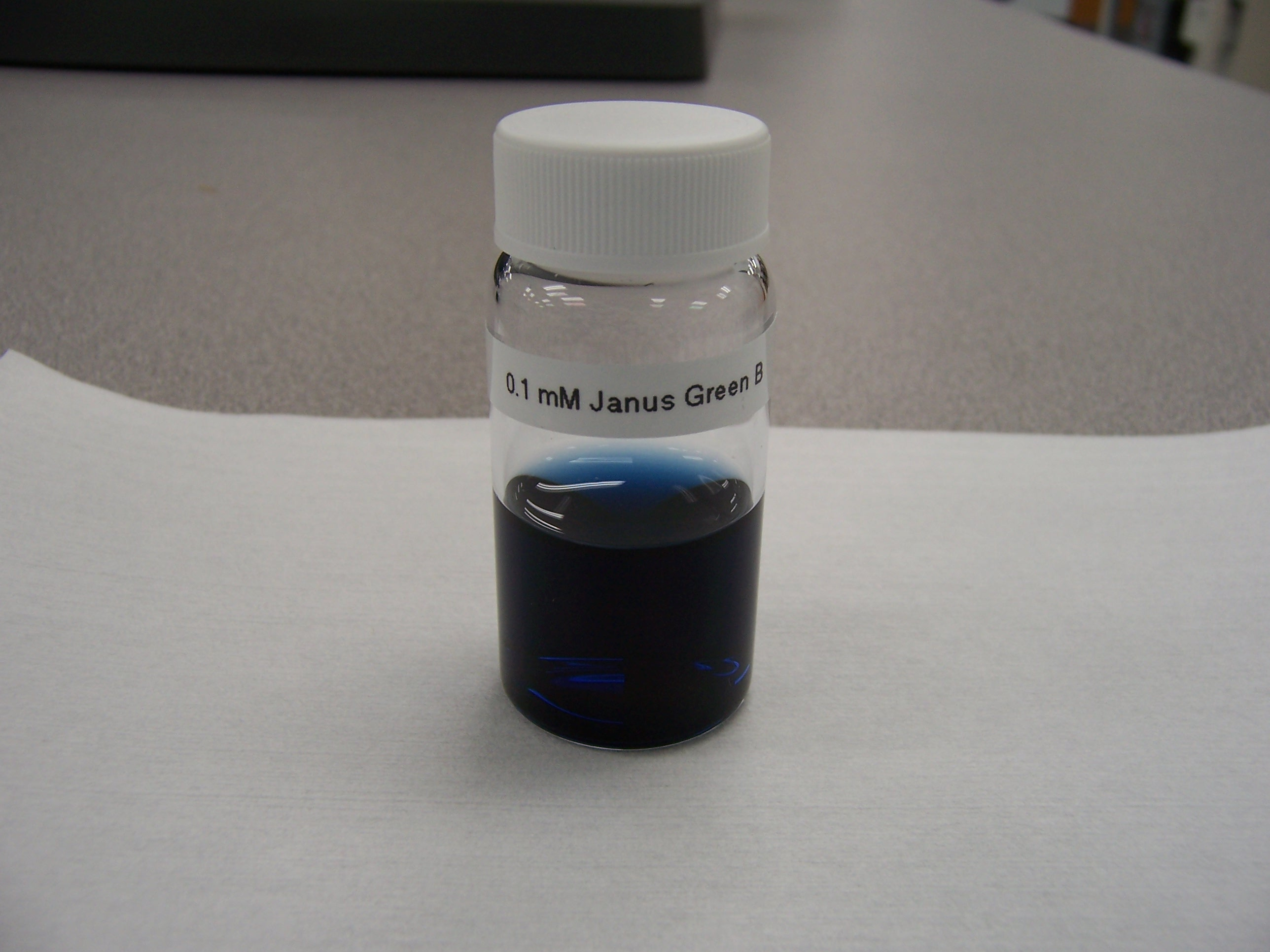
Janus Green B Solution

Names
- IUPAC name 8-(4-Dimethylaminophenyl)diazenyl-N,N-diethyl-10-phenylphenazin-10-ium-2-amine chloride
- Other names Diazin Green S Union Green B

Identifiers
CAS Number	2869-83-2
3D model (JSmol)	Interactive image
ChEBI	CHEBI:21184
ChemSpider	68607
ECHA InfoCard	100.018.814
EC Number	220-695-6
PubChem CID	76123
UNII	B9KQ101KHX
CompTox Dashboard (EPA)	DTXSID80883898
- InChI: InChI=1S/C30H31N6.ClH/c1-5-35(6-2)26-17-19-28-30(21-26)36(25-10-8-7-9-11-25)29-20-23(14-18-27(29)31-28)33-32-22-12-15-24(16-13-22)34(3)4;/h7-21H,5-6H2,1-4H3;1H/q+1;/p-1 Key: XXACTDWGHQXLGW-UHFFFAOYSA-M
- SMILES: CCN(CC)C1=CC2=[N+](C3=C(C=CC(=C3)N=NC4=CC=C(C=C4)N(C)C)N=C2C=C1)C5=CC=CC=C5.[Cl-]

Properties
Chemical formula	C_{30}H_{31}ClN_{6}
Molar mass	511.06 g/mol
- Except where otherwise noted, data are given for materials in their standard state (at 25 °C [77 °F], 100 kPa). verify (what is ?) Infobox references

Janus Green B is a basic dye and vital stain used in histology. It is also used to stain mitochondria supravitally, as was introduced by Leonor Michaelis in 1900.

The indicator Janus Green B changes colour according to the amount of oxygen present. When oxygen is present, the indicator oxidizes to a blue colour. In the absence of oxygen, the indicator is reduced and changes to a pink colour.
