= Evans blue (dye) =

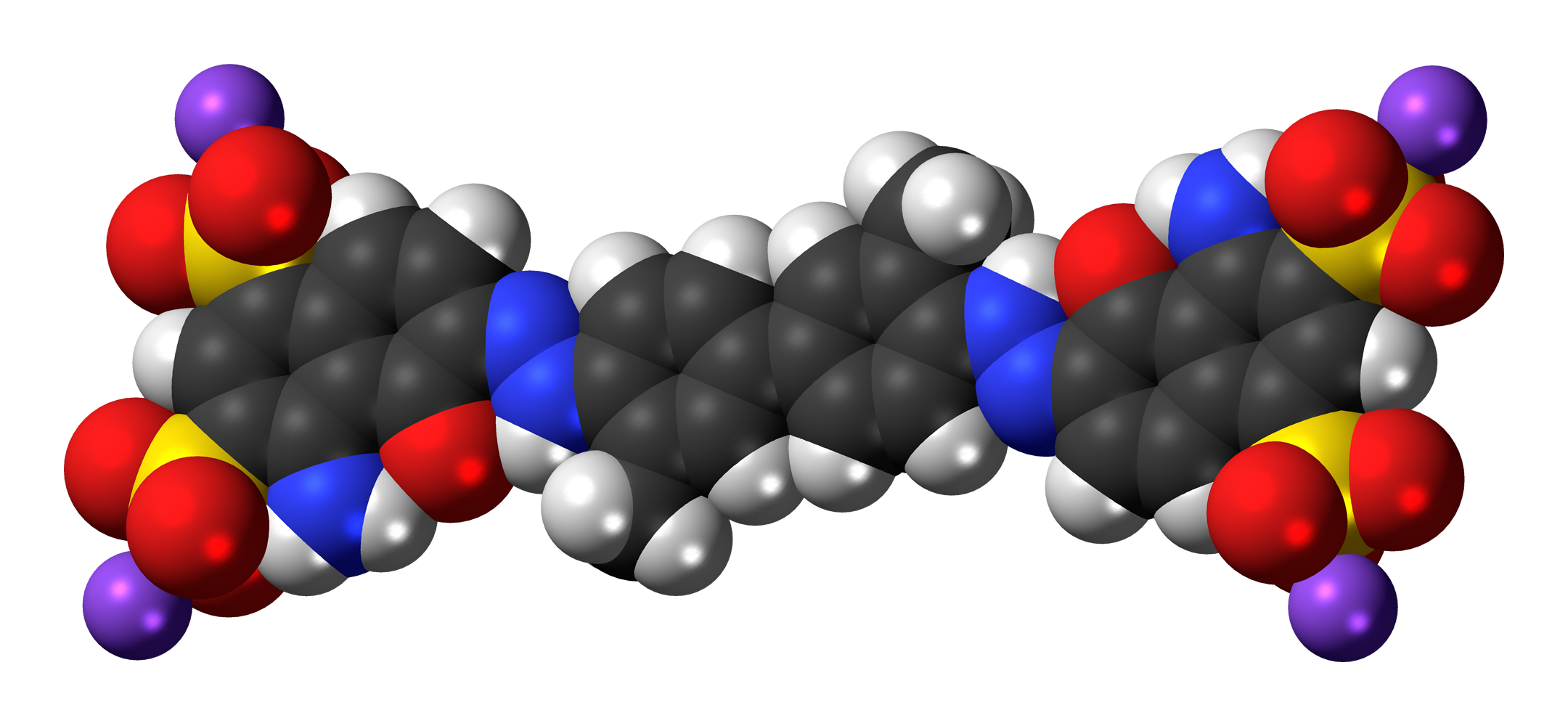

Names
- IUPAC name tetrasodium (6E,6'E)-6,6-[(3,3'-dimethylbiphenyl-4,4'-diyl)di(1E)hydrazin-2-yl-1-ylidene]bis(4-amino-5-oxo-5,6-dihydronaphthalene-1,3-disulfonate)

Identifiers
| CAS Number | 314-13-6 |
| 3D model (JSmol) | Interactive image |
| ChEBI | CHEBI:82467 |
| ChEMBL | ChEMBL1200712 |
| ChemSpider | 7840775 |
| ECHA InfoCard | 100.005.676 |
| KEGG | C19422 |
| MeSH | Evans+blue |
| PubChem CID | 6321418 |
| UNII | 45PG892GO1 |
| CompTox Dashboard (EPA) | DTXSID9022815 |
- InChI: InChI=1S/C34H28N6O14S4.4Na/c1-15-11-17(3-7-21(15)37-39-23-9-5-19-25(55(43,44)45)13-27(57(49,50)51)31(35)29(19)33(23)41)18-4-8-22(16(2)12-18)38-40-24-10-6-20-26(56(46,47)48)14-28(58(52,53)54)32(36)30(20)34(24)42;;;;/h3-14,37-38H,35-36H2,1-2H3,(H,43,44,45)(H,46,47,48)(H,49,50,51)(H,52,53,54);;;;/q;4*+1/p-4/b39-23-,40-24+;;;; Key: KBNIFDASRCWYGC-KUDYKLHASA-J
- SMILES: [Na+].[Na+].[Na+].[Na+].[O-]S(=O)(=O)c6cc(c(N)c5c6C=C/C(=N\Nc1ccc(cc1C)c4ccc(N\N=C3/C=Cc2c(cc(c(N)c2C3=O)S([O-])(=O)=O)S([O-])(=O)=O)c(C)c4)C5=O)S([O-])(=O)=O

Properties
| Chemical formula | C_{34}H_{24}N_{6}Na_{4}O_{14}S_{4} |
| Molar mass | 960.809 |
- Except where otherwise noted, data are given for materials in their standard state (at 25 °C [77 °F], 100 kPa). verify (what is ?) Infobox references

T-1824 or Evans blue, often incorrectly rendered as Evan's blue, is an azo dye that has a very high affinity for serum albumin. Because of this, it can be useful in physiology in estimating the proportion of body water contained in blood plasma. It fluoresces with excitation peaks at 470 and 540 nm and an emission peak at 680 nm.

Evans blue dye has been used as a viability assay on the basis of its penetration into non-viable cells, although the method is subject to error because it assumes that damaged or otherwise altered cells are not capable of repair and therefore are not viable.

Evans blue is also used to assess the permeability of the blood–brain barrier to macromolecules. Because serum albumin cannot cross the barrier and virtually all Evans blue is bound to albumin, normally the neural tissue remains unstained. When the blood–brain barrier has been compromised, albumin-bound Evans blue enters the CNS.

Evans blue is pharmacologically active, acting as a negative allosteric modulator of the AMPA and kainate receptors and as an inhibitor of vesicular glutamate transporters. It also acts on P2 receptors.

It was named after Herbert McLean Evans, an American anatomist.
