= Časy =

- Municipality
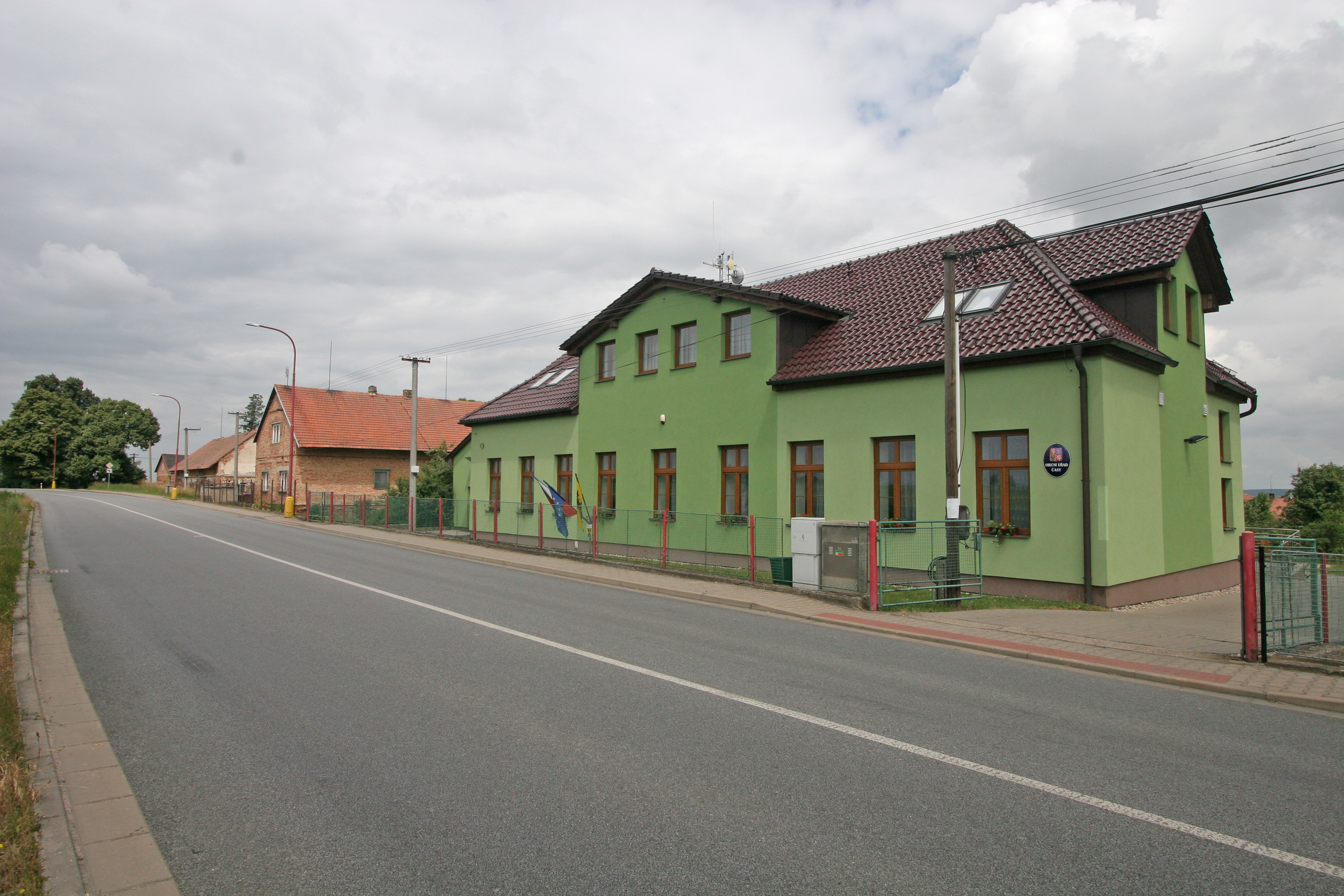
- Municipal office

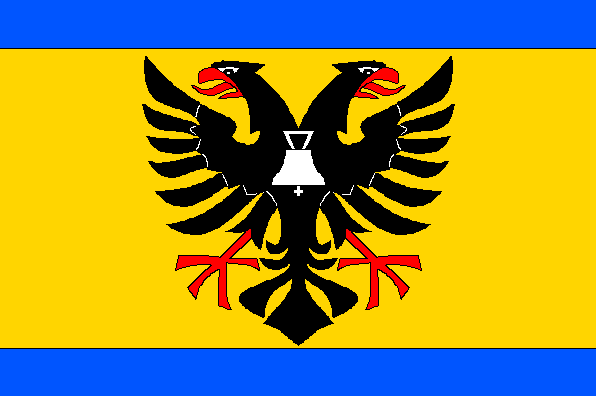
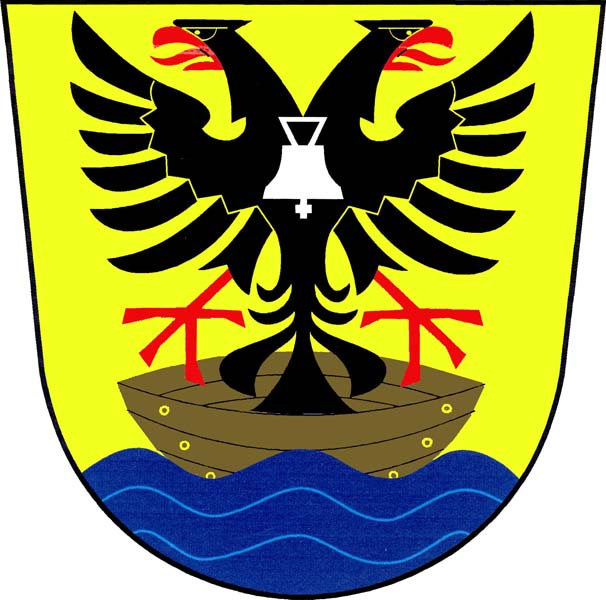
- Flag Coat of arms

- Location in the Czech Republic
- Coordinates: 50°4′10″N 15°53′53″E
- Country: Czech Republic
- Region: Pardubice
- District: Pardubice
- First mentioned: 1494

Area
  - Total: 2.58 km^{2} (1.00 sq mi)
- Elevation: 248 m (814 ft)

Population (2026-01-01)
  - Total: 230
  - Density: 89/km^{2} (230/sq mi)
- Time zone: UTC+1 (CET)
  - Summer (DST): UTC+2 (CEST)
- Postal code: 534 01
- Website: www.obeccasy.cz

Časy is a municipality and village in Pardubice District in the Pardubice Region of the Czech Republic. It has about 200 inhabitants.

== Demographics ==
Historical population
Year	Pop.	±%
1869	192	—
1880	198	+3.1%
1890	221	+11.6%
1900	237	+7.2%
1910	274	+15.6%
1921	280	+2.2%
1930	327	+16.8%
1950	255	−22.0%
1961	239	−6.3%
1970	214	−10.5%
1980	199	−7.0%
1991	178	−10.6%
2001	182	+2.2%
2011	214	+17.6%
2021	221	+3.3%
Source: Censuses
