= Propidium iodide =

Identifiers
CAS Number	25535-16-4
3D model (JSmol)	Interactive image
ChEBI	CHEBI:51240
ChEMBL	ChEMBL345124
ChemSpider	94732
ECHA InfoCard	100.042.786
PubChem CID	104981
UNII	TP416O228T
CompTox Dashboard (EPA)	DTXSID20894084
- InChI: InChI=1S/C27H33N4.2HI/c1-4-31(3,5-2)17-9-16-30-26-19-22(29)13-15-24(26)23-14-12-21(28)18-25(23)27(30)20-10-7-6-8-11-20;;/h6-8,10-15,18-19,29H,4-5,9,16-17,28H2,1-3H3;2*1H/q+1;;/p-1 Key: XJMOSONTPMZWPB-UHFFFAOYSA-M; InChI=1/C27H33N4.2HI/c1-4-31(3,5-2)17-9-16-30-26-19-22(29)13-15-24(26)23-14-12-21(28)18-25(23)27(30)20-10-7-6-8-11-20;;/h6-8,10-15,18-19,29H,4-5,9,16-17,28H2,1-3H3;2*1H/q+1;;/p-1 Key: XJMOSONTPMZWPB-REWHXWOFAB
- SMILES: CC[N+](C)(CC)CCC[n+]1c2cc(N)ccc2c3ccc(N)cc3c1c4ccccc4.[I-].[I-]

Properties
Chemical formula	C_{27}H_{34}I_{2}N_{4}
Molar mass	668.3946
- Except where otherwise noted, data are given for materials in their standard state (at 25 °C [77 °F], 100 kPa). verify (what is ?) Infobox references

Propidium iodide (or PI) is a fluorescent intercalating agent that can be used to stain cells and nucleic acids. PI binds to DNA by intercalating between the bases with little or no sequence preference. When in an aqueous solution, PI has a fluorescent excitation maximum of 493 nm (blue-green), and an emission maximum of 636 nm (red). After binding DNA, the quantum yield of PI is enhanced 20-30 fold, and the excitation/emission maximum of PI is shifted to 535 nm (green) / 617 nm (orange-red). Propidium iodide is used as a DNA stain in flow cytometry to evaluate cell viability or DNA content in cell cycle analysis, or in microscopy to visualize the nucleus and other DNA-containing organelles. Propidium Iodide is not membrane-permeable, making it useful to differentiate necrotic, apoptotic and healthy cells based on membrane integrity. PI also binds to RNA, necessitating treatment with nucleases to distinguish between RNA and DNA staining. PI is widely used in fluorescence staining and visualization of the plant cell wall.

== See also ==
- Viability assay
- Vital stain
- SYBR Green I
- Ethidium bromide
