= Trypan blue =

Blue-colored dye

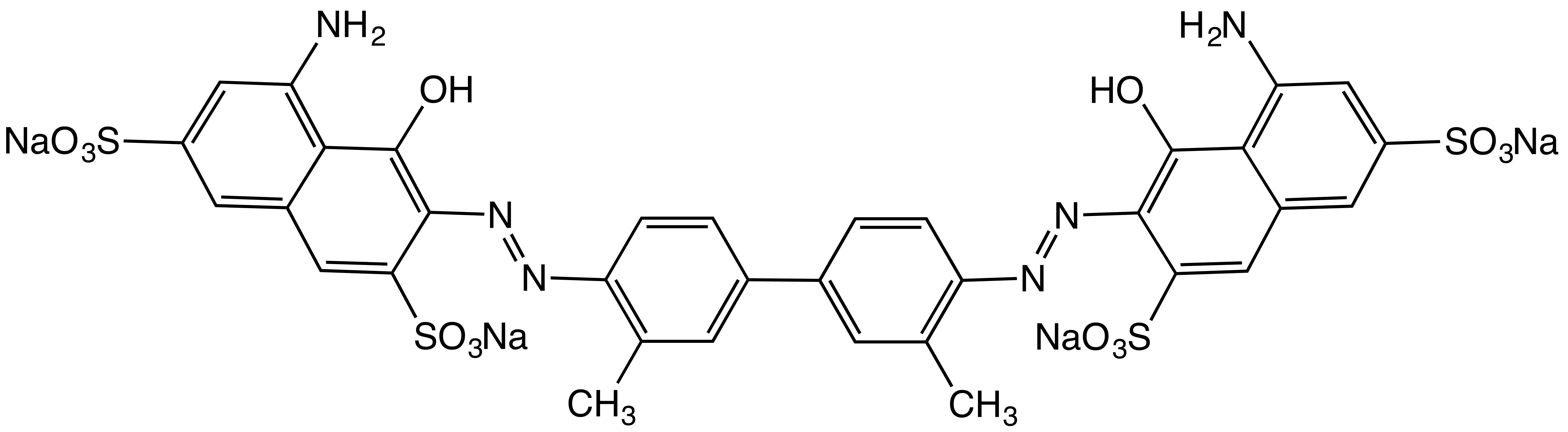

Names
- IUPAC name (3Z,3'Z)-3,3'-[(3,3'-dimethylbiphenyl-4,4'-diyl)di(1Z)hydrazin-2-yl-1-ylidene]bis(5-amino-4-oxo-3,4-dihydronaphthalene-2,7-disulfonic acid)

Identifiers
CAS Number	72-57-1 (tetrasodium salt)
3D model (JSmol)	Interactive image
ChEBI	CHEBI:78897
ChEMBL	ChEMBL1640
ChemSpider	10482308
ECHA InfoCard	100.000.715
KEGG	C19307
PubChem CID	5904246
UNII	I2ZWO3LS3M
CompTox Dashboard (EPA)	DTXSID4026268
- InChI: InChI=1S/C34H28N6O14S4.4Na/c1-15-7-17(3-5-25(15)37-39-31-27(57(49,50)51)11-19-9-21(55(43,44)45)13-23(35)29(19)33(31)41)18-4-6-26(16(2)8-18)38-40-32-28(58(52,53)54)12-20-10-22(56(46,47)48)14-24(36)30(20)34(32)42;;;;/h3-14,41-42H,35-36H2,1-2H3,(H,43,44,45)(H,46,47,48)(H,49,50,51)(H,52,53,54);;;;/q;4*+1/p-4/b39-37+,40-38+;;;; Key: GLNADSQYFUSGOU-GPTZEZBUSA-J; InChI=1S/C34H28N6O14S4.4Na/c1-15-7-17(3-5-25(15)37-39-31-27(57(49,50)51)11-19-9-21(55(43,44)45)13-23(35)29(19)33(31)41)18-4-6-26(16(2)8-18)38-40-32-28(58(52,53)54)12-20-10-22(56(46,47)48)14-24(36)30(20)34(32)42;;;;/h3-14,41-42H,35-36H2,1-2H3,(H,43,44,45)(H,46,47,48)(H,49,50,51)(H,52,53,54);;;;/q;4*+1/p-4/b39-37+,40-38+;;;; Key: GLNADSQYFUSGOU-WLILTGDCBQ; Key: GLNADSQYFUSGOU-GPTZEZBUSA-J
- SMILES: [Na+].[Na+].[Na+].[Na+].[O-]S(=O)(=O)c6cc1cc(cc(N)c1c(O)c6/N=N/c2ccc(cc2C)c5ccc(/N=N/c4c(cc3cc(cc(N)c3c4O)S([O-])(=O)=O)S([O-])(=O)=O)c(C)c5)S([O-])(=O)=O

Properties
Chemical formula	C_{34}H_{24}N_{6}Na_{4}O_{14}S_{4}
Molar mass	960.81
Appearance	deep blue in aqueous solution
Melting point	> 300 °C (572 °F; 573 K)
Solubility in water	10mg/ml
Solubility	20 mg/mL in methyl Cellosolve, and 0.6 mg/mL in ethanol

Pharmacology
ATC code	S01KX02 (WHO)

Hazards
- Lethal dose or concentration (LD, LC)
LD_{50} (median dose)	6200 mg/kg (oral, rat)
- Except where otherwise noted, data are given for materials in their standard state (at 25 °C [77 °F], 100 kPa). verify (what is ?) Infobox references

Trypan blue is an azo dye. It is a direct dye for cotton textiles. In biosciences, it is used as a vital stain to selectively colour dead tissues or cells blue.

Live cells or tissues with intact cell membranes are not coloured. Since cells are very selective in the compounds that pass through the membrane, in a viable cell trypan blue is not absorbed; however, it traverses the membrane in a dead cell. Hence, dead cells appear as a distinctive blue colour under a microscope. Since live cells are excluded from staining, this staining method is also described as a dye exclusion method.

== Background and chemistry ==
Trypan blue is derived from toluidine, that is, any of several isomeric bases, C_{14}H_{16}N_{2}, derived from toluene. Trypan blue is so-called because it can kill trypanosomes, the parasites that cause sleeping sickness. An analog of trypan blue, suramin, is used pharmacologically against trypanosomiasis. Trypan blue is also known as diamine blue and Niagara blue.

The extinction coefficient for trypan blue is 6⋅10^{4} M^{−1} cm^{−1} at 607 nm in methanol.

Trypan red and trypan blue were first synthesized by the German scientist Paul Ehrlich in 1904.

== Uses of trypan blue ==
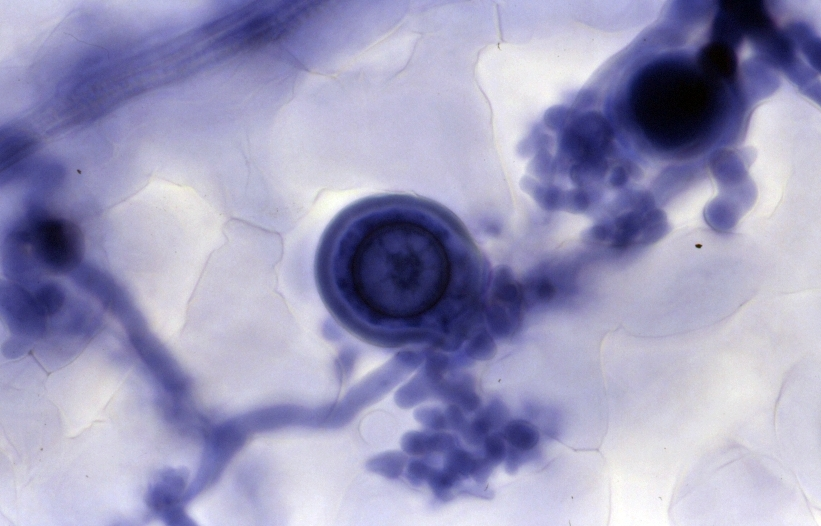
Observation with an optical microscope of Hyaloperonospora parasitica within a leaf of Arabidopsis thaliana by using the trypan blue staining.

Trypan blue is commonly used in microscopy (for cell counting) and in laboratory mice for assessment of tissue viability. The method cannot distinguish between necrotic and apoptotic cells.

It may be used to observe fungal hyphae and stramenopiles.

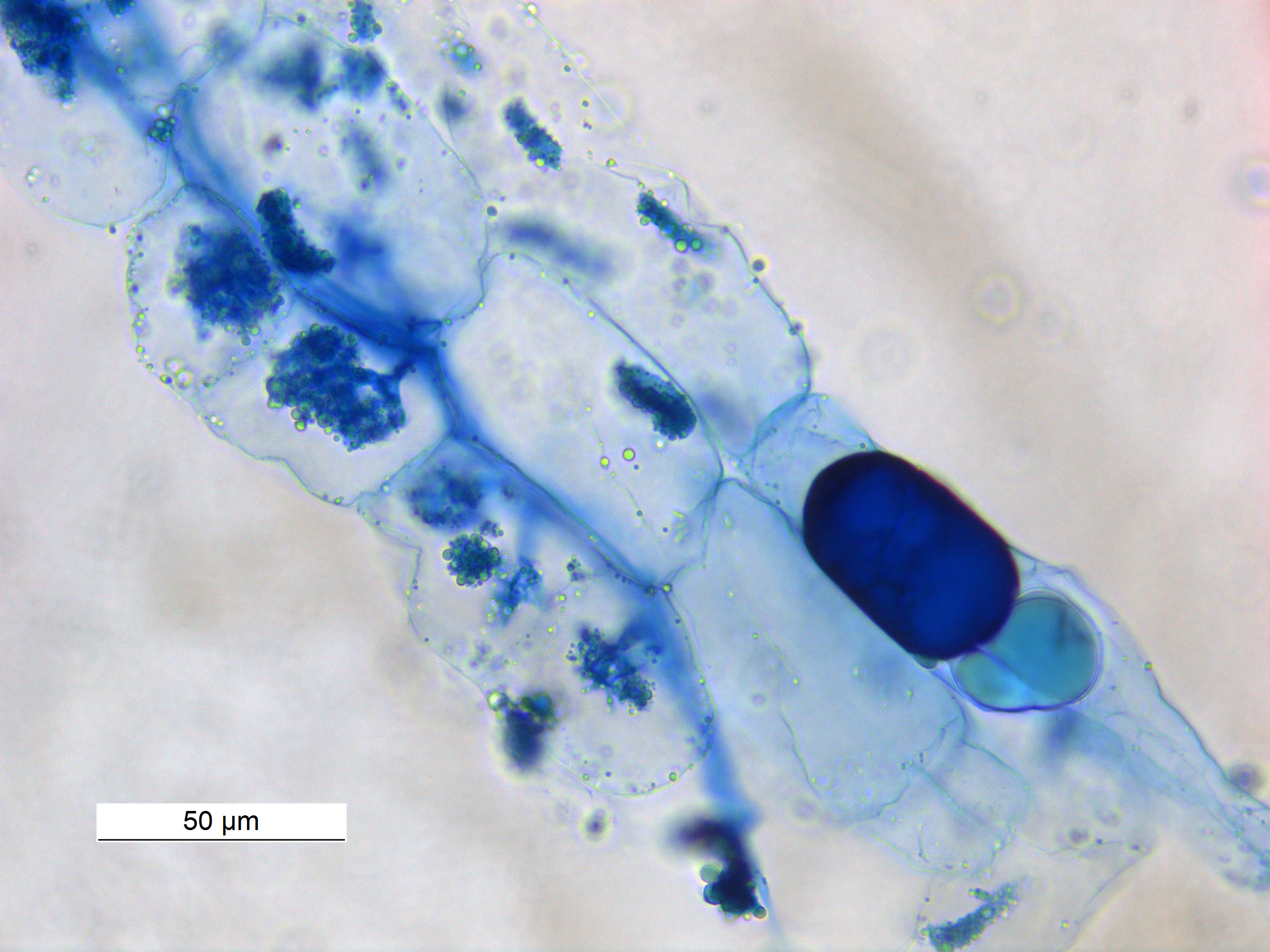
Vesicular Arbuscular Mycorrhizae visualised using clearing of tissue followed by staining with Trypan blue

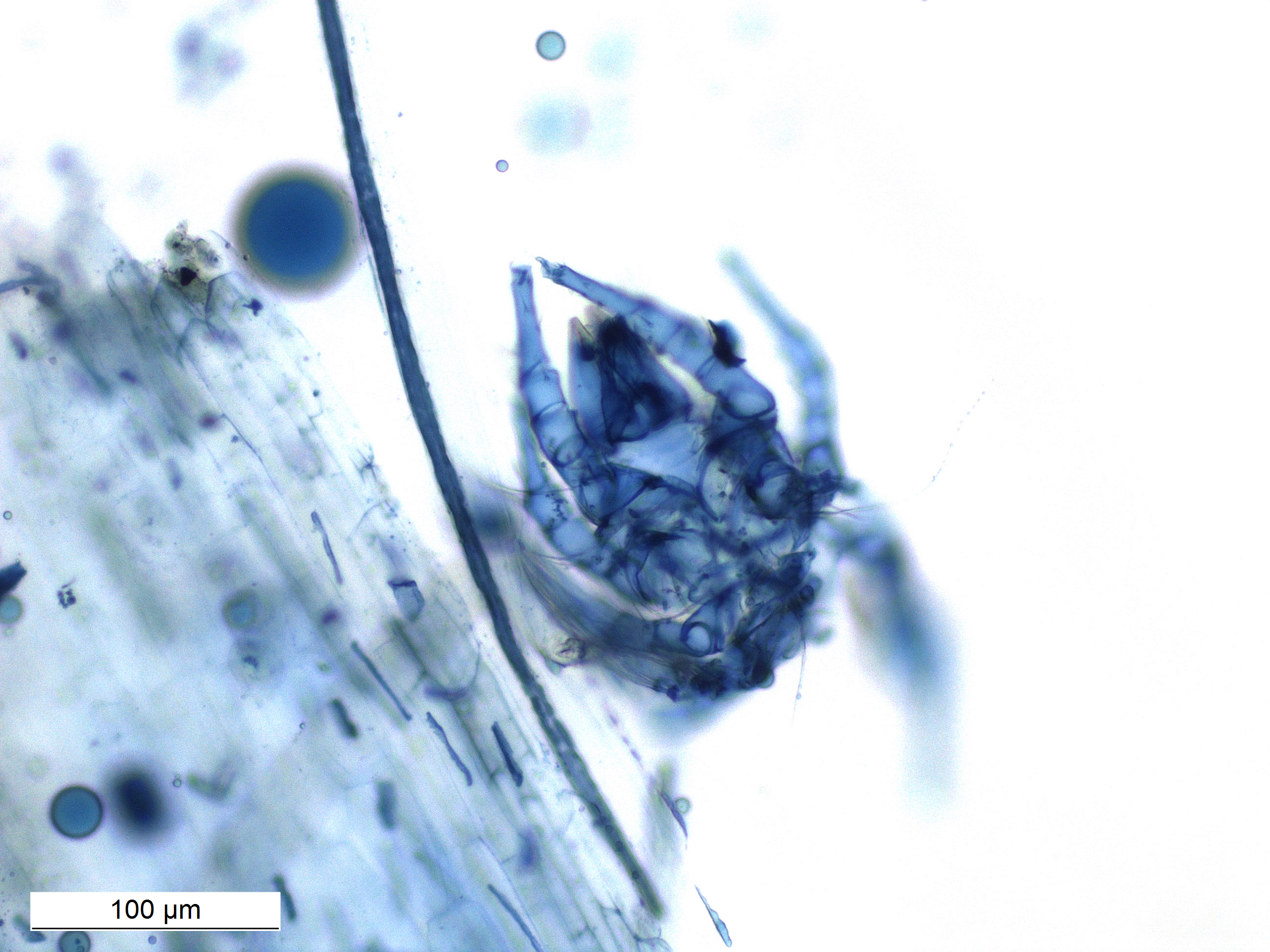
Soil arthropod takes trypan blue stain

Trypan blue is also used in ophthalmic cataract surgery to stain the anterior capsule in the presence of a mature cataract, to aid in visualization, before creating the continuous curvilinear capsulorhexis. In keratoplasty, trypan blue can be used to stain the posterior stromal fibers during deep lamellar endothelial keratoplasty (DLEK) and to stain the endothelium in Descemet's stripping endothelial keratoplasty (DSEK). Trypan blue is used in vitreoretinal surgeries also.

In early 20th century, the existence of a barrier protective toward the brain (blood brain barrier) was inferred, based on the observation that injection of trypan blue in animals led to whole‐body staining except for the brain and spinal cord.

== Synonyms ==
- Azidine blue 3B
- Benzamine blue 3B
- Benzo Blue bB
- Chlorazol blue 3B
- Diamine blue 3B
- Dianil blue H3G
- Direct blue 14
- Niagara blue 3B
