= Meir Wilchek =

Israeli biochemist (born 1935)

- מאיר וילצ'ק
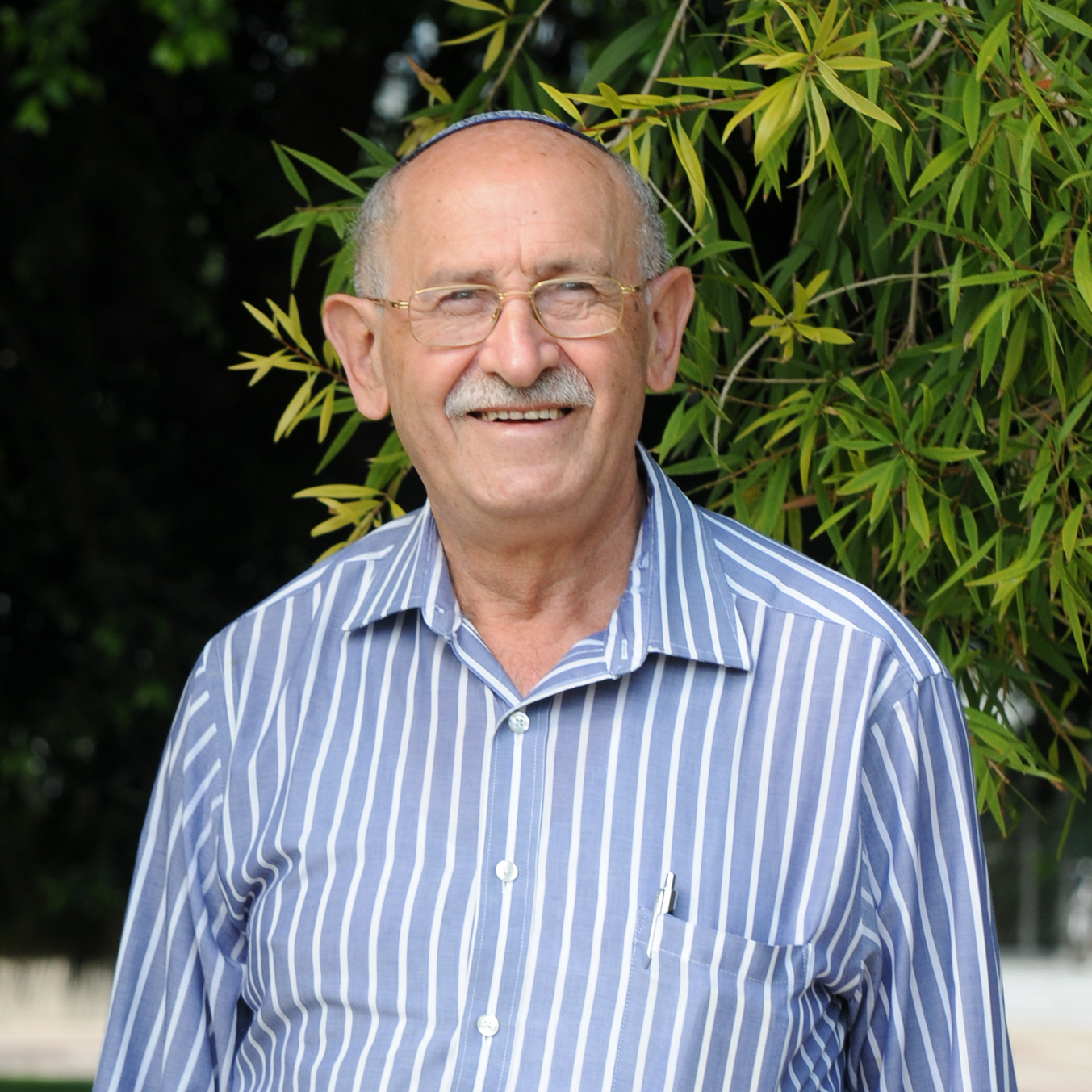
- Born: 17 October 1935 (age 91); Warsaw, Poland
- Education: Bar Ilan University and the Weizmann Institute of Science
- Known for: Affinity chromatography
- Awards: Wolf Prize, Israel Prize
- Scientific career
- Fields: Biochemist
- Workplaces: Weizmann Institute of Science

Meir Wilchek (Hebrew: מאיר אשר וילצ'ק; born 17 October 1935) is an Israeli biochemist. He is a professor at the Weizmann Institute of Science.

== Early life and education ==
Meir Wilchek was born in Warsaw, Poland, scion of a rabbinical family. During the Holocaust, he escaped from the German-occupied territories to the territories occupied by Russia, and was transferred to Siberia, while his father, who served as a community rabbi in Warsaw, was killed in Flossenbürg concentration camp. He survived, and immigrated to Israel in 1949 with his mother and sister. He graduated with B.Sc. in chemistry from Bar Ilan university and Ph.D. in biochemistry from the Weizmann Institute of Science. Wilchek has published over 400 scientific papers, and consulted various biotech companies. He was also in the party list of Mafdal and Meimad for the Knesset.

== Scientific contributions ==
Meir Wilchek is known for his research in the field of biorecognition or affinity phenomenon, and its various application, e.g. for affinity chromatography, affinity labeling, affinity therapy, and the avidin-biotin system. The avidin-biotin complex is the highest affinity interaction in nature, and its utilization to biochemistry integrates all of the former approaches.

Other contributions include conversion of serines to cysteines, and was the first to prove experimentally the equation of Forster on dependence of energy transfer on distance, an approach known today as FRET. He also studied the fine structure of these chromophores using circular dichroism. More recently, he participated in a research team who studied how garlic works at the molecular level, thanks to a unique biotechnological procedure for producing large quantities of pure allicin, garlic's main biologically active component.

=== Affinity chromatography ===
Affinity chromatography is a method of separating biochemical mixtures, based on a highly specific biologic interaction such as that between antigen and antibody, enzyme and substrate, or receptor and ligand. The method was subsequently adopted for a variety of other techniques. Specific uses of affinity chromatography include antibody affinity, Immobilized metal ion affinity chromatography and purification of recombinant proteins - possibly the most common use of the method. To purify, proteins are tagged e.g. using His-tags or GST (glutathione-S-transferase) tags, which can be recognized by a metal ion ligand, such as imidazole.

In 1971, Wilchek and colleagues applied this method to show that protein kinase is composed of regulatory and catalytic subunits. In 1972, Wilchek showed that the method can be used to remove toxic compounds from blood, as exemplified by the removal of heme peptides from blood using immobilized human serum albumin, thus laying the grounds for modern hemoperfusion

=== Affinity labeling ===
Affinity label is a molecule that is similar in structure to a particular substrate for a specific enzyme. It is considered to be a class of irreversible inhibitors. These molecules covalently modify active site residues in order to elucidate the structure of the active site. Using this method, Wilchek collaborated with a team who proved that the binding site of antibodies lies in the Fv portion of the molecule and involves three hypervariable sites, today called the complementarity-determining regions (CDRs).

=== Affinity therapy ===
Affinity therapy, or immunotoxins is a biorecognition-based approach to selectively deliver a cytotoxic drug or toxin to a specific target cell. The field of affinity therapy was pioneered by Wilchek, together with Michael Sela, Ester Hurwitz, and Ruth Arnon. In 1975, they applied drug-conjugated antibodies for the targeted delivery of cytotoxic compounds to cancer cells. They also demonstrated the advantage of having a polymeric spacer between the antibody and the drug and showed the effectiveness of conjugating simple polymers such as dextran for drug delivery and targeting. This approach was later adopted by others and eventually led to efficient treatment of human breast cancer by recombinant humanized anti-HER2 antibody (Herceptin) in a mixture with paclitaxel and doxorubicin. In 2003, Wilchek collaborated in a team who introduced a system based on antibody-directed enzyme prodrug therapy (ADEPT), using antibody-conjugated alliinase to produce a cytotoxic agent, allicin, in situ (at the site) of the cancer

=== The avidin-biotin system ===
The avidin–biotin system is a technique for studying the interaction between two biomolecules in an indirect manner, as follows: Biotin is chemically coupled to a binder molecule (e.g., a protein, DNA, hormone, etc.) without disturbing the interaction with its target molecule; avidin is then used to “sandwich” between the biotinylated binder and a reporter molecule or probe. This allows for a variety of tasks, including localization and identification of the binder or target molecule. Consequently, the avidin-biotin system can frequently replace radioactive probes. Together with Ed Bayer, Wilchek established the Avidin-biotin system as a powerful tool in biological sciences. Early in the 1970s, they exploited Avidin as a probe and developed new methods and reagents to biotinylate antibodies and other biomolecules. Today, the system is applied in research and diagnostics as well as medical devices and pharmaceuticals. Examples include western blot, ELISA, ELISPOT and pull-down assays. More recently, Wilchek participated in structural studies of the avidin–biotin complex, to characterize the unique properties of this strong interaction. The studies have culminated in the determination of the 3D structure of the avidin–biotin complex by X-ray crystallography, which aids in the design of specific artificial recognition sites.

== Honors and awards ==
- 1981–1982: Fogarty International Scholar
- 1981: Honorary Member of the American Society of Biological Chemistry
- 1984: Rothschild Prize in Chemistry
- 1987: Wolf Prize in Medicine, jointly with Pedro Cuatrecasas, "for the invention and development of affinity chromatography and its applications to biomedical sciences."
- 1987: Pierce Prize for Biorecognition Technology
- 1988: Elected Member of the Israel Academy of Sciences and Humanities
- 1989: Doctor of Science, honoris causa, University of Waterloo, Canada
- 1989: Barnett Lecturer, Northeastern University, Boston
- 1990: Israel Prize, in life sciences
- 1990: Sarstedt Prize (Numbrecht, Germany)
- 1993: Foreign Associate Member, Institute of Medicine, National Academy of Science, USA
- 1995: Doctor of Science, honoris causa, Bar Ilan University, Israel
- 1996: International Distinguished Clinical Chemist Award, International Federation of Clinical Chemistry (IFCC)
- 2000: Doctor of Science, honoris causa, University Jyvaskyla, Finland
- 2000: Honorary Doctorate, Ben-Gurion University of the Negev
- 2002: Honorary Citizen, City of Rehovot, Israel
- 2004: Wilhelm Exner Medal.
- 2004: Christian B. Anfinsen Award of The Protein Society
- 2004: Wilhelm-Exner Medal, OGV, President of Austria
- 2005: Emet Prize, presented by the Prime Minister of Israel

== See also ==
- List of Israel Prize recipients
