= MHC multimer =

MHC multimers are oligomeric forms of MHC molecules, designed to identify and isolate T-cells with high affinity to specific antigens amid a large group of unrelated T-cells. Multimers generally range in size from dimers to octamers; however, some companies use even higher quantities of MHC per multimer. Multimers may be used to display class 1 MHC, class 2 MHC, or nonclassical molecules (e.g. CD1d) from species such as monkeys, mice, and humans.

== Background ==
Since T-cell receptors have a low affinity for their MHC counterparts, it was historically problematic to label T cells effectively using single MHC-T-cell interactions. However, in 1996 it was proposed by John Altman to use a complex of multiple MHC molecules to form a more stable bond between corresponding T-cells.

== Production ==
The most commonly used MHC multimers are tetramers. These are typically produced by biotinylating soluble MHC monomers, which are typically produced recombinantly in eukaryotic or bacterial cells. These monomers then bind to a backbone, such as streptavidin or avidin, creating a tetravalent structure. These backbones are conjugated with fluorochromes to subsequently isolate bound T-cells via flow cytometry.

== Potential clinical applications ==
MHC multimers allow for a previously unattainable level of specificity in antigen-specific T-cell detection and isolation. This ability gives rise to several clinical applications. MHC multimers allow for ex vivo selection and proliferation of T-cells specific to viral or tumor-related antigens, which can then be reintroduced to augment the immune system. MHC multimers can also be used to eliminate graft-originating T-cells on transplant organs, ex vivo. MHC multimers may also be used to eliminate harmful or unwanted T-cells in vivo, such as those that target self cells and lead to autoimmune disease. Cancer immunotherapy and vaccine development can also be largely influenced by this technology.

== Sub-types ==
=== MHC tetramer ===
MHC tetramers consist of four MHC molecules, a tetramerization agent and a fluorescently labeled protein (usually streptavidin). Streptavidins have also been generated with 6 or 12 binding sites for MHC. MHC tetramers are used to identify and label specific T-cells by epitope specific binding, allowing the antigen specific immune response to be analyzed in both animal model and in human. MHC tetramers were originally developed using MHC class I molecules for the recognition of cytotoxic T cells, but over the last decade they have allowed for the recognition of CD4 T cells by a wide variety of antigens. Tetramer assays are used for single-cell phenotyping and cell counting, and offer an important advantage over other methods, such as ELISPOT and single-cell PCR because they enable the recovery and further study of sorted cells. As a flow-cytometry-based application, tetramers are also easy to use and have a short assay time, similar to Antibody-based flow cytometry studies.

MHC tetramers are used in studies of pathogen immunity and vaccine development, in evaluation of antitumor responses, in allergy monitoring and desensitization studies, and in autoimmunity. They provide an ideal means to characterize the T cells that respond to a vaccine, and they have been used to test T cell responses in many vaccine systems, including influenza, yellow fever, tuberculosis, HIV/SIV and a large number of cancer vaccine trials, including melanoma and chronic myeloid leukemia. Class II tetramers have been used for analysis of a variety of human CD4 T cell responses to pathogens, including influenza A, Borrelia, Epstein–Barr virus, CMV, Mycobacterium tuberculosis, human T-lymphotropic virus 1, hepatitis C, anthrax, severe acute respiratory syndrome virus, human papillomavirus, and HIV. Tetramer variants have been developed that, either radiolabelled or coupled to a toxin such as saporin, can be injected into live mice to modulate or even deplete specific T cell populations. Peptide–MHC tetramers have also been used therapeutically. For instance, cytomegalovirus-specific T cells have been enriched to high levels of purity using magnetic bead-based enrichment for use as a therapy for stem cell transplant patients.

=== MHC pentamer ===
Pentamers consist of five MHC-peptide headgroups, arranged in a planar configuration so that, unlike MHC tetramers, all of the headgroups can contact the CD8+ T cell. The headgroups are connected via flexible linkers to a coiled-coil multimerization domain, which in turn is connected to five fluorescent or biotin tags. Pentamers are available with APC, R-PE, or biotin labelling, and also unlabelled with separate tags for long-term storage. Pentamers offer enhanced brightness and avidity of staining compared with other multimer reagents.

MHC pentamers have been used in the detection of antigen-specific CD8+ T cells in flow cytometry, and are cited in over 750 peer-reviewed publications , including several in the journals Nature and Science. MHC pentamers can also be used in tissue staining, and in magnetic isolation of antigen-specific T cells.

While pentamers are licensed for research use only, in 2009 a special dispensation was granted for a team to use them for isolating EBV-specific T cells for mother-daughter transfer, for lifesaving treatment of EBV-associated lymphoma in the daughter.

Pentamers are available for antigens from the following disease areas: adenovirus, HCV, malaria, SIV, autoimmune disease, HIV, transplantation antigens, trypanosoma, cancer, HPV, tuberculosis, chlamydia, HTLV, vaccinia, CMV, influenza, VSV, EBV, LCMV, RSV, West Nile virus, HBV, Listeria, Sendai virus, yellow fever. Custom specificity pentamers may also be commissioned.

Pentamers are currently used in research by academia, industry and clinicians, and research using pentamers has appeared in the international media on several occasions.

=== MHC Dextramer^{®} ===
A form of MHC multimer developed and trademarked by the Danish biotechnology company, Immudex in 2002. Dextramer reagents are fluorescently labeled with FITC, PE or APC, and contain MHC molecules attached to a dextran backbone, which are used to detect antigen-specific T-cells in fluid cells and solid tissue samples using flow cytometry. These T-cells contain T-cell receptors (TCR) that recognize a specific MHC-peptide complex displayed on the surface of antigen presenting cells allowing for detection, isolation, and quantification of these specific T-cell populations due to an improved signal-to-noise ratio not present in prior generations of multimers.

Dextramer^{®} reagents have been developed with a larger number of MHC-peptides for various human, mouse, and rhesus macaque genes involved in diseases including but not limited to: cancer, HIV, Epstein–Barr virus (EBV), cytomegalovirus (CMV), LCMV, human papillomavirus (HPV), BK polyomavirus, HTLV, hepatitis, mycobacterium, and graft-versus-host disease.

Dextramer technology is currently used in academic and clinical research due to their increased specificity and binding affinity, which allows for increased avidity for specific T-cells and enhances staining intensity. This advantage is a result of the increased ability of Dextramers to bind multiple times to a single T-cell, improving the stability of this interaction as compared with other multimer technologies such as pentamers and tetramers. Further applications include the ability to isolate antigen specific T-cell populations as well as in situ detection using immunohistochemistry (IHC) for various disease states (e.g. solid tumors). These reagents are therefore important for future drug and vaccine development.

Immudex developed a CMV Dextramer^{®} assay for exploratory detection and quantification of CD8+ T-cells in blood samples, covering a broad range of epitopes to assist with screening and monitoring CMV progression in future clinical settings. MHC Dextramer^{®} reagents are available with MHC class I and MHC class II molecules.
