= Strep-tag =

Method which allows the purification and detection of proteins

The Strep-tag system is a method which allows the purification and detection of proteins by affinity chromatography. The Strep-tag II is a synthetic peptide consisting of eight amino acids (Trp-Ser-His-Pro-Gln-Phe-Glu-Lys). This peptide sequence exhibits intrinsic affinity towards Strep-Tactin, a specifically engineered streptavidin, and can be N- or C- terminally fused to recombinant proteins. By exploiting the highly specific interaction, Strep-tagged proteins can be isolated in one step from crude cell lysates. Because the Strep-tag elutes under gentle, physiological conditions, it is especially suited for the generation of functional proteins.

Strep-tag, Twin-Strep-tag and Strep-Tactin are registered trademarks of IBA Lifesciences GmbH.

== Development and biochemistry of the Strep-tag ==
Streptavidin is a tetrameric protein expressed in Streptomyces avidinii. Because of Streptavidin's high affinity for vitamin H (biotin), Streptavidin is commonly used in the fields of molecular biology and biotechnology. The Strep-tag was originally selected from a genetic library to specifically bind to a proteolytically truncated "core" version of streptavidin. Over the years, the Strep-tag was systemically optimized, to permit a greater flexibility in the choice of attachment site. Further, its interaction partner, Streptavidin, was also optimized to increase peptide-binding capacity, which resulted in the development of Strep-Tactin. The binding affinity of Strep-tag to Strep-Tactin is nearly 100 times higher than from Strep-tag to Streptavidin. The so-called Strep-tag system, consisting of Strep-tag and Strep-Tactin, has proven particularly useful for the functional isolation and analysis of protein complexes in proteome research.

== The Strep-tag principle ==
Just like other short-affinity tags (His-tag, FLAG-tag), the Strep-tag can be easily fused to recombinant proteins during subcloning of its cDNA or gene. For its expression, various vectors for various host organisms (E. coli, yeast, insect, and mammalian cells) are available. A particular benefit of the Strep-tag is its rather small size and the fact that it is biochemically almost inert. Therefore, protein folding or secretion is not influenced and usually it does not interfere with protein function. Strep-tag is especially suited for analysis of functional proteins, because the purification procedure can be kept under physiological conditions. This not only allows the isolation of sensitive proteins in a native state, but it is also possible to purify intact protein complexes, even if just one subunit carries the tag.

In the first step of the Strep-tag purification cycle, the cell lysate containing Strep-tag fusion protein is applied to a column with immobilized Strep-Tactin (step 1). After the tagged protein has specifically bound to Strep-Tactin, a short washing step with a physiological buffer (e.g. phosphate buffered saline, PBS) removes all other host proteins (step 2). This is due to Strep-Tactin's low tendency to bind proteins non specifically. Then, the purified Strep-tag fusion protein is gently eluted with a low concentration of desthiobiotin, which specifically competes for the biotin binding pocket (step 3). To regenerate the column, desthiobiotin is removed by application of a HABA containing solution (a yellow azo dye). The removal of desthiobiotin is indicated by a color change from yellow-orange to red (step 4+5). Finally, the HABA solution is washed out with a small volume of running buffer, thus making the column ready to use for the next purification run.

== Strep-tag applications ==
The Strep-tag system offers a selective tool to purify proteins under physiological conditions. The proteins obtained are bioactive and display a very high purity (above 95%). Also, the Strep-tag system can be used for protein detection in various assays. Depending on the experimental circumstances, Strep-tag antibodies or Strep-Tactin, with an enzymatic (e.g.horseradish peroxidase (HRP), alkaline phosphatase (AP)) or fluorescence (e.g. green fluorescent protein (GFP)) marker. If high purity is required, the lysate can be purified by first using Strep-Tactin and then perform a second run using antibodies against Strep-tag. This reduces the contamination with unspecific bound proteins, which might occur in some rare scenarios.

Following assays can be conducted using the Strep-tag detection system:

- one-step affinity purification
- Protein:protein interaction studies
- Colony blot, dot blot, Western blot and ELISA
- Screening for positive expression clones
- Immunocytochemistry and Immunohistochemistry
- Protein localization and targeting studies

Because the Strep-tag is capable of isolating protein complexes, strategies for the study of protein-protein interactions can also be conducted. Another option is the immobilization of Strep-tag proteins with a specific high affinity antibody on microplates or biochips.

Strep-Tag/StrepTactin system is also used in single-molecule optical tweezers and atomic force microscope experiments, showing high mechanical stability comparable to the strongest non-covalent linkages currently available.

== See also ==
- Streptamer
- Protein tag
- SpyTag
