= Streptamer =

Strep Tamer is a technology which allows the reversible isolation and staining of antigen-specific T-cells. This technology combines a current T-cell isolation method with the Strep-Tag technology. In principle, the T-cells are separated by establishing a specific interaction between the T-cell of interest and a molecule, that is conjugated to a marker which enables the isolation. The reversibility of this interaction and the low temperatures at which it is performed allow for the isolation and characterization of functional T-cells. Because T-cells remain phenotypically and functionally indistinguishable from untreated cells, this method offers modern strategies in clinical and basic T-cell research.

== Classic methods in T cell research ==
T cells play an important role in the adaptive immune system. They are capable of orchestrating, regulating and coordinating complex immune responses. A wide array of clinically relevant aspects are associated with the function or malfunction of T-cells: Autoimmune diseases, control of viral or bacterial pathogens, development of cancer or graft versus host responses. Over the past years, various methods (ELISpot Assay, intracellular cytokine staining, secretion assay) have been developed for the identification of T cells, but only major histocompatibility complex (MHC) procedures allow identification and purification of antigen-specific T cells independent of their functional status.

In principle, MHC procedures are using the T cell receptor (TCR) ligand, which is the MHC-peptide complex, as a staining probe. The MHC interacts with the TCR, which in turn is expressed on the T cells. Because TCR-MHC interactions have only a very weak affinity towards each other, monomeric MHC-epitope complexes cannot provide stable binding. This problem can be solved by using multimerized MHC-epitopes, which increases the binding avidity and therefore allows stable binding. Fluorochromes conjugated to the MHC-multimers then can be used for identification of T cells by flow cytometry. Nowadays, MHC molecules can be produced recombinantly together with the antigenic peptides which are known for a fast-growing number of diseases.

== The Streptamer technology ==
=== The Streptamer backbone ===
The Streptamer staining principle combines the classic method of T cell isolation by MHC-multimers with the Strep-tag/Strep-Tactin technology. The Strep-tag is a short peptide sequence that displays moderate binding affinity for the biotin-binding site of a mutated streptavidin molecule, called Strep-Tactin. For the Streptamer technology, the Strep-Tactin molecules are multimerized and form the "backbone", thus creating a platform for binding to strep-tagged proteins. Additionally, the Strep-Tactin backbone has a fluorescent label to allow flow cytometry analysis. Incubation of MHC-Strep-tag fusion proteins with the Strep-Tactin backbone results in the formation of a MHC-multimer, which is capable for antigen-specific staining of T cells.

=== Reversible staining ===
Because the molecule d-biotin has a much higher affinity to Strep-Tactin than Strep-tag, it can effectively compete for the binding site. Therefore, a MHC multimer based on the interaction of Strep-tag with Strep-Tactin is easily disrupted in the presence of relatively low concentrations of d-biotin. Without the Strep-Tactin backbone, the single MHC-Strep-tag fusion proteins spontaneously detach from the TCR of the T cell, because of weak binding affinities (monomeric MHC-epitope complexes cannot provide stable binding, see above).
