= Z-score (disambiguation) =

Z-score is a type of statistical ratio.

It may also refer to:

- Z-value, in ecology
- Z-factor, in high-throughput screening
- Altman Z-score, in financial analysis
