= Microheater =

Microheaters are small high-power heaters, with precise control, that can offer temperatures in excess of 1000C, even up to 1900C. Microheaters provide for accurate high temperature control, for example in electron microscopes, pressure-anvil cells or for enhancing fiberheaters. Generally speaking, the heating method for microheaters involves conversion of electrical work to high density heat. With the increase in the temperature demanded, microheater heating materials change from metallic (non-brittle GAXP) to metal-ceramic like materials (MoSi2) which tend to be brittle. With an increase in usable temperature, microheaters need to be supported or enclosed with very high thermal-resistant ceramic materials often made from small grain, high purity aluminum oxide.

Other potential uses include:

- Fuel Cell Heat Sources,
- Electronics and Substrate Heating,
- RF Applications,
- Micro tube-heaters for small volume gas heating,
- High Power micro-furnace with optional tube extension,
- Fiber optics,
- Ideal for long aspect ratio/very small diameter pieces,
- Fiber optic use to reduce diameter of fibers,
- Igniter,
- MicroPlate heaters,
- Material Testing and Characterization,
- Thermal Property Measurements,
- Diamond Anvil Cells,
- SEM/TEM/AFM,
- Gas/Vapor Heaters/Converters,
- Thin Film Preparation,

When microheaters need controls it is important to heat only electrically, so that power may be controlled by a feed-back mechanism. New superheated steam or gas spot heaters are coming into use for spot microheater applications.
