= IBA Lifesciences =

- Industry: Biotechnology
- Founded: 1996
- Founder: Dr. Herbert Stadler
- Headquarters: Göttingen, Germany
- Key people: Dr. Herbert Stadler (Founder & President) Dr. Mike Rothe (CEO) Dr. Joachim Bertram (CSO)
- Number of employees: ~50
- Website: www.iba-lifesciences.com

IBA Lifesciences is a biotechnology company providing products and custom specific services for life science applications in academia and industry worldwide. IBA focusses on two business segments: cell selection and protein purification.

The company is the original manufacturer and supplier of the Strep-tag/Strep-Tactin technology, an affinity chromatography system developed for protein purification. The method is based on one of the strongest non-covalent interactions in nature, which is the interaction of biotin to streptavidin. An intrinsic binding affinity of the Strep-tag towards Strep-Tactin results in a highly specific interaction, which enables the isolation and purification of sensitive proteins in a native state as wells as intact protein complexes, respectively. The technology was patented by the Max Planck Society (former “Garching Innovations”) and later assigned to IBA. Recently, the method was further developed to be used for cell selection from whole blood or other single cell suspensions.

== Products and technologies ==
=== Cell Selection & Expansion ===
IBA has developed an affinity chromatography system for non-magnetic isolation of peripheral blood mononuclear cells, T cells, B cells and other cells of interest. This technology is known as Fab-TACS (Traceless Affinity Cell Selection) and is based on Strep-tagged Fab fragments, which reversibly capture and release the target cells. This delivers label-free, non-activated cells suitable for immunologic or cell biological assays. The technology can be used with manual gravity flow columns as well as with the automated cell selection device FABian. Isolated and purified cells are being deployed for basic research as well as diagnostic applications. The Streptamers for cell expansion enable the controlled stimulation of T cells. They consist of non-magnetic soluble protein complexes generated by multimerization of αCD3- and αCD28 Fab-Streps with a Strep-Tactin multimer. The reversible reagents can be easily removed from the cells by the addition of biotin. This allows to regulate the extent of stimulation precisely and to study functional and label-free activated T cells.

=== Protein Production & Assays ===
The company exhibits a wide range of tools related to recombinant protein purification consisting of expression vectors, affinity purification and detection reagents based on its Strep-tag/Strep-Tactin system.

This can be used for i.e. drug screening, diagnostic assays, immobilization and interaction studies. Due to its small size and biochemically almost inert character, the Strep-tag does not influence protein folding, secretion and function.

The latest generation of the system is called Strep-Tactin XT. In combination with the Twin Strep-tag it binds the recombinant protein of interest with an extremely high affinity. This results in improved batch purification runs, higher yields of the expressed recombinant protein and a versatile approach for the immobilization on solid surfaces like beads, slides/arrays or microplates.

== History ==
1996 - Institut für Bioanalytik GmbH was founded by Herbert Stadler, IBA introduces Strep-tag products

1998 - Acquisition of NAPS Göttingen GmbH (Nucleic Acid Products Supply)

1999 - Biologics joint venture with GBF Braunschweig

2001 - Institut für Bioanalytik GmbH was renamed to IBA GmbH

2003 - IBA introduces Streptamer cell isolation technology

2004 - Operations segmented into Protein, Gene and Cell TAGnology business units

2007 - IBA introduces StarGate cloning system

2008 - Innovation Award for StarGate

2010 - IBA introduces Fab-Streptamer technology

2011 - Innovation Award for Streptamer cell isolation technology

2012 - IBA introduces Fab-TACS (Formerly known as T-CATCH) column based cell purification

2014 - IBA earned its ISO 9001:2008 certification for Quality Management Standard, IBA introduces Strep-Tactin XT products

2015 - 6th foreign Trade Award of Lower Saxony (Germany), IBA launches MEXi mammalian expression system

2016 - IBA introduces cell selection device FABian

== Awards & Sponsorship ==
In 2011 IBA was granted multiple local innovation awards, e.g. for its Streptamer technology, which allows reversible isolation and staining of antigen-specific T cells. Additionally, a diagnostic test developed by IBA and Fassisi for veterinary diseases was chosen as one of the top five innovations by the county of Göttingen in 2015. Furthermore, the company honors young scientists and participated in research consortia as well.

== Structure ==
IBA Lifesciences is a limited liability company (referred to as GmbH in Germany). The officers of the company are Dr. Herbert Stadler (Founder and President), Dr. Mike Rothe (CEO) and Dr. Joachim Bertram (CSO). Headquartered in Göttingen, Germany with locations in Leipzig, Munich (both Germany) and Saint Louis (United States).
