= NeutrAvidin =

Neutralite Avidin protein is a deglycosylated version of chicken avidin, with a mass of approximately 60,000 daltons. As a result of carbohydrate removal, lectin binding is reduced to undetectable levels, yet biotin binding affinity is retained because the carbohydrate is not necessary for this activity. Avidin has a high pI but NeutrAvidin has a near-neutral pI (pH 6.3), minimizing non-specific interactions with the negatively-charged cell surface or with DNA/RNA. Neutravidin still has lysine residues that remain available for derivatization or conjugation.

Like avidin itself, NeutrAvidin is a tetramer with a strong affinity for biotin (K_{d} = 10^{−15}M). In biochemical applications, streptavidin, which also binds very tightly to biotin, may be used interchangeably with NeutrAvidin.

Avidin immobilized onto solid supports is also used as purification media to capture biotin-labelled protein or nucleic acid molecules. For example, cell surface proteins can be specifically labelled with membrane-impermeable biotin reagent, then specifically captured using a NeutrAvidin support.
