= Pedro Cuatrecasas =

American biochemist and academic (1936–2025)

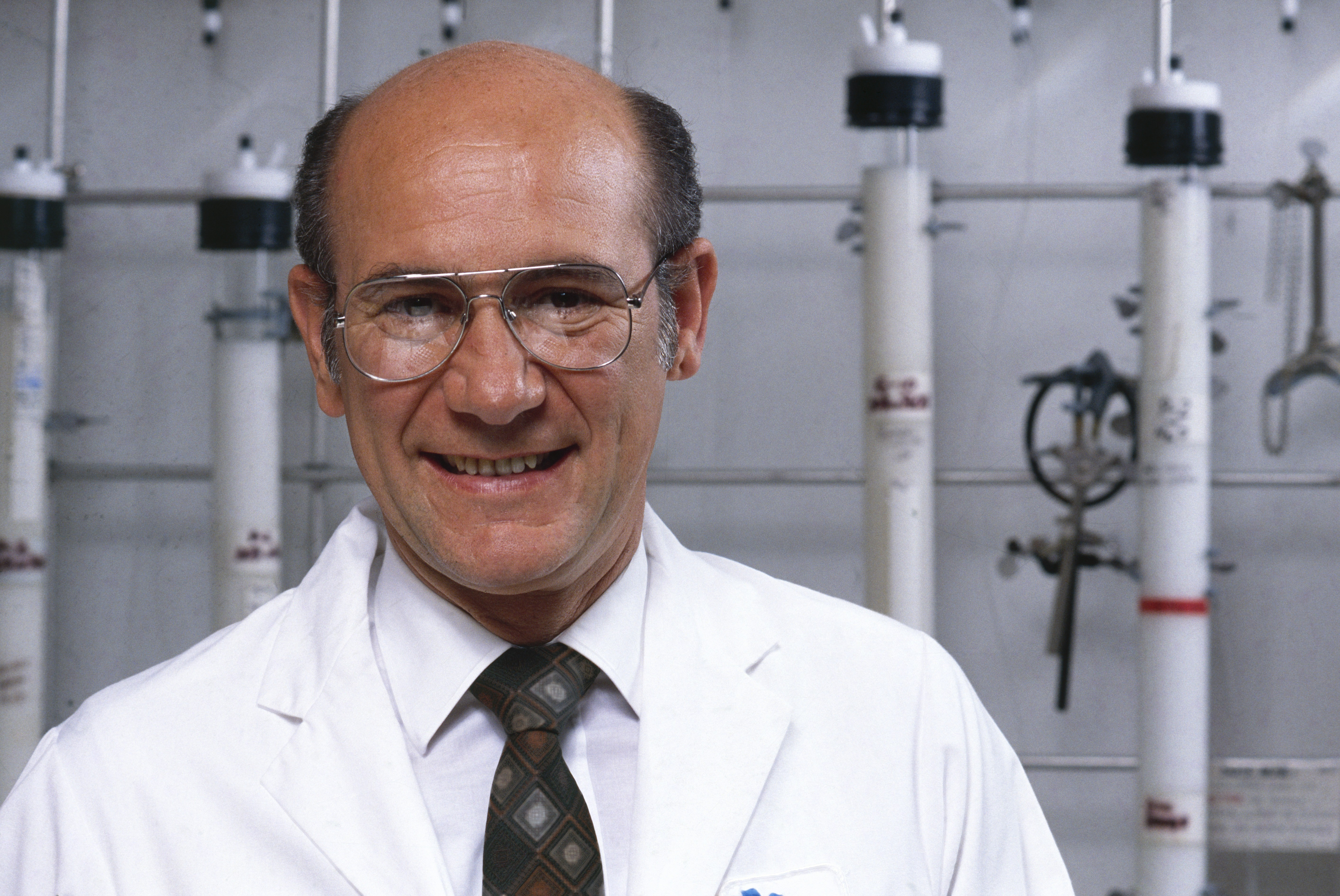
- Born: 27 September 1936; Madrid, Spain
- Died: 19 March 2025 (aged 88); La Jolla, California, U.S.
- Citizenship: American
- Education: Washington University School of Medicine, M.D. 1962
- Known for: Invention of affinity chromatography
- Awards: Wolf Prize in Medicine
- Scientific career
- Fields: Biochemistry, pharmacology, medicine
- Institutions: UC San Diego

Pedro Cuatrecasas (27 September 1936 – 19 March 2025) was a Spanish-born American biochemist and academic who was an adjunct professor of Pharmacology & Medicine at the University of California San Diego.

== Background ==
Pedro Cuatrecasas was born in Madrid, Spain on 27 September 1936. He completed his A.B. from Washington University in St. Louis in 1958. He completed his M.D. from Washington University School of Medicine in 1962.

Cuatrecasas died in La Jolla, California on 19 March 2025, at the age of 88.

== Research ==
Cuatrecasas is known for the invention and development of affinity chromatography, a process utilized within the Aethlon HemopurifierTM. He was involved in the discovery, development and marketing registration of more than forty medicines. Some of those medicines include: zidovudine (AZT, AIDS), acyclovir (Zovirax, anti-herpes), permethrin (Rid, head and body lice), bupropion (Wellbutrin, antidepressant), colfosceril palmitate (Exosurf, infant acute respiratory distress), remifentanil (Ultiva, analgesic/anesthetic), sumatriptan (Imigran, migraine), salmeterol (Serement, asthma), tacrine (Cognex, Alzheimers), gabapentin (Neurontin, epilepsy and neuropathic pain), troglitazone (Rezulin, diabetes), and atorvastatin (Lipitor, cholesterol lowering).

In 1987, Cuatrecasas was awarded the Wolf Prize in Medicine in 1987 along with Meir Wilchek "for the invention and development of affinity chromatography and its applications to biomedical sciences."
