= Immudex =

- Type: Private
- Industry: Reagents and Diagnostics
- Predecessor: Dako
- Founded: 2009
- Headquarters: Copenhagen, Denmark
- Area served: Copenhagen, Denmark; Fairfax, Virginia
- Key people: Helene Kähler Hjenner (CEO); Liselotte Brix (COO)
- Products: MHC Dextramer
- Website: www.immudex.com

Immudex is a Danish Reagents and Diagnostics company established in 2009. The company is operating from offices located in Copenhagen, Denmark, and in Fairfax, Virginia. Immudex specializes in the production of MHC Dextramers. MHC Dextramers are chemical reagents that are designed to detect antigen-specific T cells.

All Immudex products, whether on the marked or in development, are based on its proprietary MHC Dextramer technology. The use of MHC Dextramers offers a new method to accurately detect and quantify antigen-specific CD8+ T cells.

While some of the technology is currently only sold for Research use only (RUO), clinical applications are being actively pursued. Currently, Immudex has several development projects for clinically applicable MHC Dextramers. Even so, the first MHC Dextramers clinical reagent has been developed and approved for clinical in vitro diagnostics in Europe. Namely the CE-marked kit for enumeration of cytomegalovirus-specific T cells. Immudex primarily focuses on the identification of producing large quantities of CD8+ T cells by the means of MHC class I molecules. Even so, the research and development into the application of MHC class II Dextramers might expand the technology.

== History ==
Originally, Immudex operated as an individual division within the much larger Danish pharmaceutical company Dako. Immudex was later spun out as a separate business, when the focus of Dako largely shifted to cancer diagnostics. Immudex currently have clients worldwide with major markets in the United States and Europe. Patents for the MHC Dextramer technology were filed at Dako in 2001, and the Immudex division was launched in 2005.

In 2011, Immudex received the prestigious “Entrepreneur of the Year 2011” award in the Life Sciences category granted by Ernst & Young. Immudex received this award because of the commitment of the company, articulated in the company's "make it work and make it better" strategy to generate results for both practitioners and patients. The award is given to companies not only focused on financial growth, but also for softer values such as the entrepreneur's social responsibility and the ability to aspire an motivate the organization.

== Dextramer technology ==
A large number of immunotherapies, currently in development, seek to induce, expand, activate or eliminate antigen-specific T cells. It is therefore important to be able to quantify and characterize the T cell responses before, during and after treatment in order to understand if the proposed change to the T cells has been effectuated.

The process of negative selection in the thymus guarantees that virtually all T cells have very weak affinity for self-antigens. Therefore, the study of these lymphocytes in autoimmune diseases and cancer has been difficult, until the fairly recent introduction of MHC multimers. Tetramers, which are among the most popular form of these multimer complexes, have four binding sites. The Tetramers were originally developed in Academia. Many further developments in this technology have taken place at biotechnology companies.

The Immudex MHC Dextramers, which represent the latest advancement in this field, provide an exponentially greater probability of successful identification of antigen-specific T cells. This can be done, because the MHC Dextramers have nine, or more binding sites per dextran backbone. Scientists have been optimistic about the potential of such technology, since it will help broaden the understanding of T cell responses and will in the future be clinically applicable to many different antigen-specific T cells.

== Products ==
The MHC Dextramers are fluorescent MHC multimer reagents, developed for sensitive, specific and accurate detection of antigen-specific T cells by using Flow cytometry. The MHC Dextramers covers human, mouse, and monkey alleles that all display disease relevant antigenic peptides. The MHC Dextramers can thereby be used for monitoring antigen-specific T cell responses.

Virus Dextramer collection 1 - provides reagents for detection, quantification and isolation of virus specific T cells. It furthermore enables detection for CMV-, EBV-, influenza-, and BK virus specific CD8+ T cells.

Dextramer CMV kit - These MHC Dextramers provide a method for quantification of CMV-specific CD8+ T cells in whole blood samples as an aid in predicting and monitoring patients at risk of developing CMV-related disease.

Melanoma Dextramer collection 1 - comprises MHC Dextramers specific for 6 different melanoma-associated antigens and can be used for the detection, enumeration and isolation of melanoma-specific CD8+ T cells from blood or tumor tissue.

Cancer Testis Antigen CD1d Dextramer - These MHC Dextramers are flow cytometry reagents for the identification and sorting of Natural killer cells (NKT), as well as an extensive range of single reagents for detection of cancer- and viral-specific T cells. The CD1d/α-GalCer displays human CD1d molecules loaded with α-GalCer.

== Development Projects ==
Though Immudex specializes in MHC Dextramer technology, the company is also pursuing development projects in diagnostics for Lyme disease/Borreliosis, based on the detection of Borrelia-specific T cells in diseased patients.

Clinical application of the CE-market Dextramer CMV kit has been approved for the European market. The CMV kit will also be attempted approved for the US market through a number of clinical trials and S10K approval. The CMV kit is intended for identification and enumerication of CMV-specific CD8+ T cells in whole blood samples. Furthermore, the MHC Dextramer CMV kit can be used for the assessment of CMV-specific immune status in HLA-matched patients.

Knowledge of the level of viral-specific T cells allow evaluation of the patients preparedness for fighting the viral infection and thereby avoid unnecessary antiviral treatment. CMV infections are often unnoticed by healthy people, but can be life-threatening for immune compromised individuals, such as HIV-infected persons and organ-transplant recipients.

== Collaborations and partnerships ==
In 2013, Immudex entered into a co-distribution and co-promotional partnership with JPT Peptide Technologies. The goal of this partnership is to synergistically combine JPT's innovative peptide technologies along with existing products with Immudex's sophisticated MHC Dextramer products. This product combination will provide a comprehensive portfolio of high quality T cell relevant products and services for the immunotherapy and vaccine community.

== International Proficiency Panels ==
Proficiency panel testing comprises an interlaboratory system for the regular testing of accuracy that the participating laboratories can achieve. The MHC multimer panel tests the proficiency of a given laboratory in performing the flow cytometry based MHC multimer assay on blood and in performing an ELISpot Assay.

In the fall of 2013 Immudex entered an agreement with the US cancer Immunotherapy consortium (CIC) and the European Association for Cancer Immunotherapy (CIMIT). The agreement dictates that Immudex will provide MHC-peptide multimers and Elispot proficiency panels to laboratories worldwide, independently of their background and associations.

CIC and CIMT originally established proficiency panel programs to offer an external validation of assay performance and to enhance assay harmonization. Over the years, more than one hundred laboratories have participated. Not only from the cancer field, but also from other immunological fields utilizing immune monitoring. As a result, two frequently used immune monitoring methods, have now reached a high degree of harmonization.

Immudex, specialized in the detection of antigen-specific T cells has been an active participant in the proficiency panel process.

Immudex will continue the external validation program established by CIC and CIMT under the successfully implemented harmonization guidelines and will promote a more widespread use of these technologies in the development of new cancer immunotherapies and vaccines against other diseases such as HIV, TB, diabetes and others.
