= Avidin =

Type of protein

Avidin family
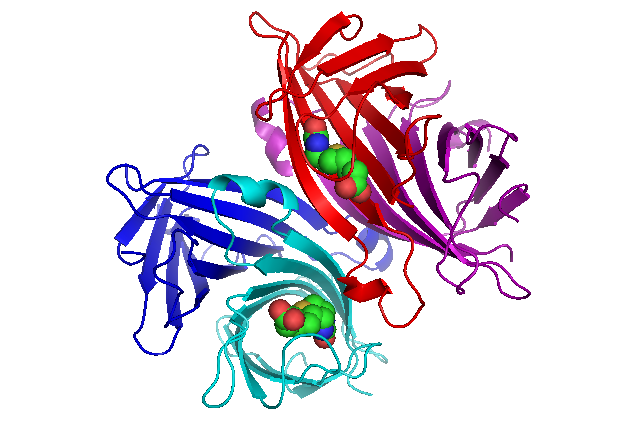
- Tetrameric structure of streptavidin with 2 bound biotins

Identifiers
- Symbol: Avidin
- Pfam: PF01382
- InterPro: IPR005468
- PROSITE: PDOC00499
- CATH: 1slf
- SCOP2: 1slf / SCOPe / SUPFAM
Available protein structures:
- PDB: IPR005468 PF01382 (ECOD; PDBsum)
- AlphaFold: IPR005468; PF01382

Biotin - Avidin can bind up to four molecules of biotin simultaneously with a high degree of affinity and specificity

Avidin is a tetrameric biotin-binding protein produced in the oviducts of birds, reptiles and amphibians and deposited in the whites of their eggs. Dimeric members of the avidin family are also found in some bacteria. In chicken egg white, avidin makes up approximately 0.05% of total protein (approximately 1800 μg per egg). The tetrameric protein contains four identical subunits (homotetramer), each of which can bind to biotin (Vitamin B_{7}, vitamin H) with a high degree of affinity and specificity. The dissociation constant of the avidin-biotin complex is measured to be K_{D} ≈ 10^{−15} M, making it one of the strongest known non-covalent bonds.

In its tetrameric form, avidin is estimated to be 66–69 kDa in size. 10% of the molecular weight is contributed by carbohydrate, composed of four to five mannose and three N-acetylglucosamine residues The carbohydrate moieties of avidin contain at least three unique oligosaccharide structural types that are similar in structure and composition.

Functional avidin is found in raw egg, but depending on the amount of heat it is exposed to during cooking, the quantity of molecules available for binding biotin can change. The natural function of avidin in eggs is not known, although it has been postulated to be made in the oviduct as a bacterial growth inhibitor, by binding biotin helpful for bacterial growth. As evidence for this, streptavidin, a related protein with equal biotin affinity and a very similar binding site, is made by certain strains of Streptomyces bacteria, and is thought to serve to inhibit the growth of competing bacteria, in the manner of an antibiotic.

A non-glycosylated form of avidin has been isolated from commercially prepared product; however, it is not conclusive as to whether the non-glycosylated form occurs naturally or is a product of the manufacturing process.

== Discovery ==
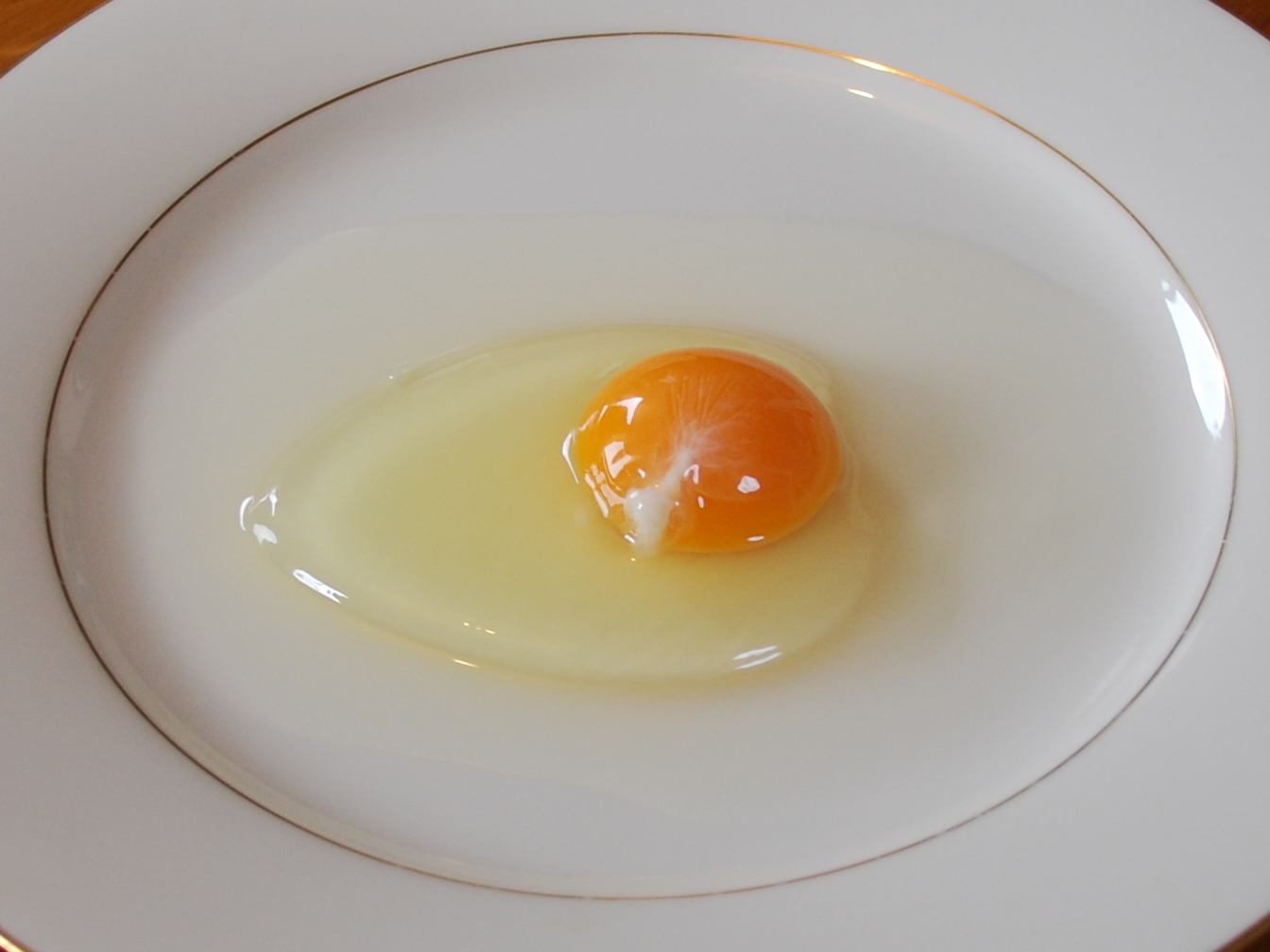
A raw egg yolk surrounded by the egg white. Avidin was first isolated from raw chicken egg white by Esmond Emerson Snell

Avidin was discovered by Esmond Emerson Snell (1914–2003). This discovery began with the observation that chicks on a diet of raw egg white were deficient in biotin, despite availability of the vitamin in their diet. It was concluded that a component of the egg-white was sequestering biotin which Snell verified in vitro using a yeast assay. Snell later isolated the component of egg white responsible for biotin binding, and, in collaboration with Paul György, confirmed that the isolated egg protein was the cause of biotin deficiency or “egg white injury”. At the time the protein had been tentatively named avidalbumin (literally, hungry albumin) by researchers at the University of Texas. The name of the protein was later revised to "avidin" based on its affinity for biotin (avid + biotin).

== Applications ==
Avidin

Identifiers
- Organism: Chicken
- Symbol: AVD
- Orthologs: OMA: entry
- UniProt: P02701
Search for
- Structures: Swiss-model
- Domains: InterPro
- Unless otherwise specified, "avidin" the biomedical reagent is chicken avidin.

Research in the 1970s helped establish the avidin-biotin system as a powerful tool in biological sciences. Aware of the strength and specificity of the avidin-biotin complex, researchers began to exploit chicken avidin and streptavidin as probes and affinity matrices in numerous research projects. Soon after, researchers Bayer and Wilchek developed new methods and reagents to biotinylate antibodies and other biomolecules, allowing the transfer of the avidin-biotin system to a range of biotechnological applications. Today, avidin is used in a variety of applications ranging from research and diagnostics to medical devices and pharmaceuticals.

Avidin's affinity for biotin is exploited in wide-ranging biochemical assays, including western blot, ELISA, ELISPOT and pull-down assays. In some cases the use of biotinylated antibodies has allowed the replacement of radioiodine labeled antibodies in radioimmunoassay systems, to give an assay system which is not radioactive.

Avidin immobilized onto solid supports is also used as purification media to capture biotin-labelled protein or nucleic acid molecules. For example, cell surface proteins can be specifically labelled with membrane impermeable biotin reagent, then specifically captured using an avidin-based support.

== Modified forms ==
As a basically charged glycoprotein, avidin exhibits non-specific binding in some applications. Neutralite avidin, a deglycosylated avidin with modified arginines, exhibits a more neutral isoelectric point (pI) and is available as an alternative to native avidin, whenever problems of non-specific binding arise. Deglycosylated, neutral forms of chicken avidin are available through Sigma-Aldrich (Extravidin), Thermo Scientific (NeutrAvidin), Invitrogen (NeutrAvidin), and e-Proteins (NeutraLite).

Given the strength of the avidin-biotin bond, dissociation of the avidin-biotin complex requires extreme conditions that cause protein denaturation. The non-reversible nature of the avidin-biotin complex can limit avidin's application in affinity chromatography applications where release of the captured ligand is desirable. Researchers have created an avidin with reversible binding characteristics through nitration or iodination of the binding site tyrosine. The modified avidin exhibits strong biotin binding characteristics at pH 4 and releases biotin at a pH of 10 or higher. A monomeric form of avidin with a reduced affinity for biotin is also employed in many commercially available affinity resins. The monomeric avidin is created by treatment of immobilized native avidin with urea or guanidine HCl (6–8 M), giving it a lower dissociation K_{D} ≈ 10^{−7}M. This allows elution from the avidin matrix to occur under milder, non-denaturing conditions, using low concentrations of biotin or low pH conditions. For a single high affinity biotin binding site without crosslinking, a monovalent version of avidin's distant relative, streptavidin, may be used.

== Blocking of biotin binding ==
The thermal stability and biotin binding activity of avidin are of both practical and theoretical interest to researchers, as avidin's stability is unusually high and avidin is an antinutrient in human food. A 1966 study published in Biochemical and Biophysical Research Communications found that the structure of avidin remains stable at temperatures below 70 °C (158 °F). Above 70 °C (158 °F), avidin's structure is rapidly disrupted and by 85 °C (185 °F), extensive loss of structure and loss of ability to bind biotin is found. A 1991 assay for the Journal of Food Science detected substantial avidin activity in cooked egg white: "mean residual avidin activity in fried, poached and boiled (2 min) egg white was 33%, 71% and 40% of the activity in raw egg white." The assay surmised that cooking times were not sufficient to adequately heat all cold spot areas within the egg white. Complete inactivation of avidin's biotin binding capacity required boiling for over 4 minutes.

A 1992 study found that thermal inactivation of the biotin binding activity of avidin was described by D_{121 °C} = 25 min and z = 33 °C. This study disagreed with prior assumptions "that the binding site of avidin is destroyed on heat denaturation".

The biotin-binding properties of avidin were exploited during the development of idrabiotaparinux, a long-acting low molecular weight heparin used in the treatment of venous thrombosis. Due to the long-acting nature of idraparinux, concerns were made about the clinical management of bleeding complications. By adding a biotin moiety to the idraparinux molecule, idrabiotaparinux was formed; its anticoagulant activity in the setting of a bleeding event can be reversed through an intravenous infusion of avidin.

== See also ==
- Streptavidin
- Biotinylation
