= Biotinylation =

Biotechnological modification process to attach Biotin to a molecule

In biochemistry, biotinylation is the process of covalently attaching biotin to a protein, nucleic acid or other molecule. Biotinylation is rapid, specific and is unlikely to disturb the natural function of the molecule due to the small size of biotin (MW = 244.31 g/mol). Biotin binds to streptavidin and avidin with an extremely high affinity, fast on-rate, and high specificity, and these interactions are exploited in many areas of biotechnology to isolate biotinylated molecules of interest. Biotin-binding to streptavidin and avidin is resistant to extremes of heat, pH and proteolysis, making capture of biotinylated molecules possible in a wide variety of environments. Also, multiple biotin molecules can be conjugated to a protein of interest, which allows binding of multiple streptavidin, avidin or neutravidin protein molecules and increases the sensitivity of detection of the protein of interest. There is a large number of biotinylation reagents available that exploit the wide range of possible labelling methods. Due to the strong affinity between biotin and streptavidin, the purification of biotinylated proteins has been a widely used approach to identify protein-protein interactions and post-translational events such as ubiquitylation in molecular biology.

== Labeling methods ==
Proteins can be biotinylated chemically or enzymatically. Chemical biotinylation utilises various conjugation chemistries to yield nonspecific biotinylation of amines, carboxylates, sulfhydryls and carbohydrates (e.g., NHS-coupling gives biotinylation of any primary amines in the protein). Enzymatic biotinylation results in biotinylation of a specific lysine within a certain sequence by a bacterial biotin ligase. Most chemical biotinylation reagents consist of a reactive group attached via a linker to the valeric acid side chain of biotin. As the biotin binding pocket in avidin / streptavidin is buried beneath the protein surface, biotinylation reagents possessing a longer linker are desirable, as they enable the biotin molecule, once it has been attached to its target, to be more accessible to binding avidin/streptavidin/Neutravidin protein. This linker can also mediate the solubility of biotinylation reagents; linkers that incorporate poly(ethylene) glycol (PEG) can make water-insoluble reagents soluble or increase the solubility of biotinylation reagents that are already soluble to some extent.

=== Enzymatic biotinylation ===
In contrast to chemical biotinylation methods, enzymatic biotinylation allows biotin to be linked at exactly one residue present in the protein. This biotinylation reaction can also go to completion, meaning that the product is generated with high uniformity and can be linked to streptavidin in a defined orientation e.g. for MHC multimers. Enzymatic biotinylation is most often carried out by E. coli biotin holoenzyme synthetase, also known as biotin ligase (BirA, P06709).

The most common way of targeting a protein of interest is by fusing the protein at its N-terminus, C-terminus or at an internal loop to a 15 amino acid peptide (GLNDIFEAQKIEWHE), termed AviTag or Acceptor Peptide (AP). Once tagged, the protein is then incubated with BirA allowing biotinylation to take place in the presence of biotin and ATP. Enzymatic biotinylation can be carried out in vitro but BirA also reacts specifically with its target peptide inside mammalian and bacterial cells and at the cell surface, while other cellular proteins are not modified. Enzymatic biotinylation can also take place in vivo typically through the co-expression of an Avitag tagged protein and BirA.

The natural substrate of BirA is the biotin carboxyl carrier protein (BCCP). Before smaller tags were discovered, a protein needed to be fused to the entire BCCP to be targeted. A protein fused by BCCP can be recognized by biotin molecules in vivo and attach to it. A few other small tags have been used before AviTag, but AviTag is the most efficient so far.

=== Primary amine biotinylation ===
The most common targets for modifying protein molecules are primary amine groups that are present as lysine side chain epsilon-amines and N-terminal α-amines. Amine-reactive biotinylation reagents can be divided into two groups based on water solubility.

N-hydroxysuccinimide (NHS) esters have poor solubility in aqueous solutions. For reactions in aqueous solution, they must first be dissolved in an organic solvent, then diluted into the aqueous reaction mixture. The most commonly used organic solvents for this purpose are dimethyl sulfoxide (DMSO) and dimethyl formamide (DMF), which are compatible with most proteins at low concentrations. Because of the hydrophobicity of NHS-esters, NHS biotinylation reagents can also diffuse through the cell membrane, meaning that they will biotinylate both internal and external components of a cell.

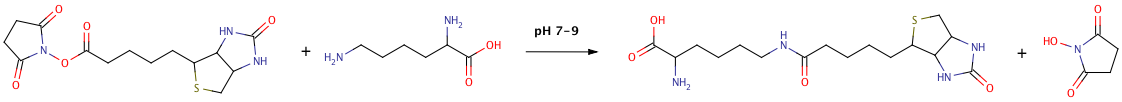

Sulfo-NHS esters are more soluble in water and should be dissolved in water just before use because they hydrolyze easily. The water solubility of sulfo-NHS-esters stems from their sulfonate group on the N-hydroxysuccinimide ring and eliminates the need to dissolve the reagent in an organic solvent. Sulfo-NHS-esters of biotin also can be used as cell surface biotinylation reagents, because they do not penetrate the cell membrane.

The chemical reactions of NHS- and sulfo-NHS esters are essentially identical, in that they both react spontaneously with amines to form an amide bond. Because the target for the ester is a deprotonated primary amine, the reaction is favored under basic conditions (above pH 7). Hydrolysis of the NHS ester is a major competing reaction, and the rate of hydrolysis increases with increasing pH. NHS- and sulfo-NHS-esters have a half-life of several hours at pH 7 but only a few minutes at pH 9.

There is some flexibility in the conditions for conjugating NHS-esters to primary amines. Incubation temperatures can range from 4-37 °C, pH values in the reaction range from 7–9, and incubation times range from a few minutes to 12 hours. Buffers containing amines (such as Tris or glycine) must be avoided, because they compete with the reaction.

=== Sulfhydryl biotinylation ===
An alternative to primary amine biotinylation is to label sulfhydryl groups with biotin. Because free sulfhydryl groups are less prevalent on most proteins compared to primary amines, sulfhydryl biotinylation is useful when primary amines are located in the regulatory domain(s) of the target protein or when a reduced level of biotinylation is required. Sulfhydryl-reactive groups such as maleimides, haloacetyls and pyridyl disulfides, require free sulfhydryl groups for conjugation; disulfide bonds must first be reduced to free up the sulfhydryl groups for biotinylation. If no free sulfhydryl groups are available, lysines can be modified with various thiolation reagents (Traut's reagent, SAT(PEG4), SATA and SATP), resulting in the addition of a free sulfhydryl. Sulfhydryl biotinylation is performed at a slightly lower pH (6.5-7.5) than labeling with NHS esters.

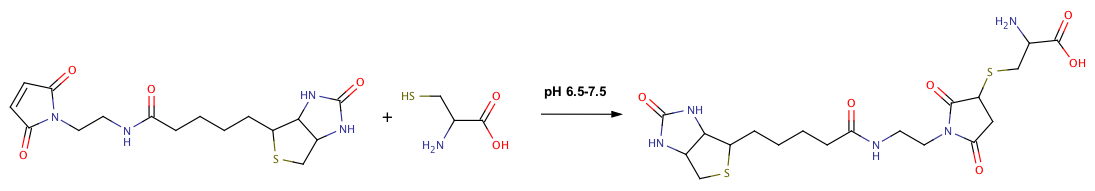

Besides whole proteins, biotinylated peptides can be synthesized by introducing a cysteine (Cys) residue during synthesis at the terminus of the amino acid chain to get a site specific and oriented biotinylation. Nucleotides can also be biotinylated by incorporation of thiolated nucleotides.

=== Carboxyl biotinylation ===
Carboxyl groups are found on the C-terminal ends of proteins and on glutamate and aspartate amino acid side chains. Biotinylation reagents that target carboxyl groups do not have a carboxyl-reactive moiety per se but instead rely on a carbodiimide crosslinker such as EDC to bind the primary amine on the biotinylation reagents to the carboxyl group on the target protein.

Biotinylation at carboxyl groups occur at pH 4.5–5.5. To prevent crossreactivity of the crosslinker with buffer constituents, buffers should not contain primary amines (e.g., Tris, glycine) or carboxyls (e.g., acetate, citrate); MES buffer is an ideal choice.

=== Glycoprotein biotinylation ===
Glycoproteins can be biotinylated by modifying the carbohydrate residues to aldehydes, which then react with hydrazine- or alkoxyamine-based biotinylation reagents. Sodium periodate oxidizes the sialic acids on glycoproteins to aldehydes to form these stable linkages at pH 4–6.

Polyclonal antibodies are heavily glycosylated, and because glycosylation does not interfere with the antibody activity, biotinylating the glycosyl groups is an ideal strategy to generate biotinylated antibodies.

=== Oligonucleotide biotinylation ===
Oligonucleotides are readily biotinylated in the course of oligonucleotide synthesis by the phosphoramidite method using commercial biotin phosphoramidite. Upon the standard deprotection, the conjugates obtained can be purified using reverse-phase or anion-exchange HPLC

=== Non-specific biotinylation ===
Photoactivatable biotinylation reagents are ideal when primary amines, sulfhydryls, carboxyls and carbohydrates are not available for labeling. These reagents rely on aryl azides, which become activated by ultraviolet light (UV; >350 nm), which then react at C-H and N-H bonds. Because these types of bonds occur independent of the type of amino acid, this type of biotinylation is termed "non-specific".

Photoactivatable biotinylation reagents can also be used to activate biotinylation at specific times in an experiment or during certain reaction conditions, by simply exposing the reaction to UV light at the specific time or condition.

== Purpose ==
=== Purification ===
The biotin tag can be used in affinity chromatography together with a column that has avidin (or streptavidin or neutravidin) bound to it, which is the natural ligand for biotin. However, harsh conditions (e.g., 6M GuHCl at pH 1.5) are needed to break the avidin/streptavidin - biotin interaction, which will most likely denature the protein carrying the biotin tag. If isolation of the tagged protein is needed, it is better to tag the protein with iminobiotin. This biotin analogue gives strong binding to avidin/streptavidin at alkaline pH, but the affinity is reduced upon lowering the pH. Therefore, an iminobiotin-tagged functional protein can be released from an avidin/streptavidin column by decreasing the pH (to around pH 4).

=== Detection ===
This tag can also be used in detection of the protein via anti-biotin antibodies or avidin/streptavidin-tagged detection strategies such as enzyme reporters (e.g., horseradish peroxidase, alkaline phosphatase) or fluorescent probes. This can be useful in localization by fluorescent or electron microscopy, ELISA assays, ELISPOT assays, western blots and other immunoanalytical methods. Detection with monovalent streptavidin can avoid clustering or aggregation of the biotinylated target.

== Other uses ==
The non-covalent bond formed between biotin and avidin or streptavidin has a binding affinity that is higher than most antigen and antibody bonds and approaches the strength of a covalent bond. This very tight binding makes labeling proteins with biotin a useful tool for applications such as affinity chromatography using immobilized avidin or streptavidin to separate the biotinylated protein from a mixture of other proteins and biochemicals. Biotinylated protein such as biotinylated bovine serum albumin (BSA) is used in solid-phase assays as a coating on the well surface in multiwell assay plates. Biotinylation of red blood cells has been used as a means of determining total blood volume without the use of radiolabels such as chromium 51, allowing volume determinations in low birth weight infants and pregnant women who could not otherwise be exposed to the required doses of radioactivity. Furthermore, biotinylation of MHC molecules to create MHC multimers has become a useful tool for identifying and isolating antigen-specific T-cell populations. More recently, in vivo protein biotinylation was developed to study protein-protein interactions and proximity in living cells

== Determining the extent of biotinylation ==
Reaction conditions for biotinylation are chosen so that the target molecule (e.g., an antibody) is labeled with sufficient biotin molecules to purify or detect the molecule, but not so much that the biotin interferes with the function of the molecule.

=== HABA assay ===
The HABA (2-(4-hydroxyazobenzene) benzoic acid) assay can be used to determine the extent of biotinylation. HABA dye is bound to avidin or streptavidin and yields a characteristic absorbance. When biotinylated proteins or other molecules are introduced, the biotin displaces the dye, resulting in a change in absorbance at 500 nm. This change is directly proportional to the level of biotin in the sample. The disadvantage of the HABA assay is that it uses large amounts of sample.

=== Streptavidin gel-shift ===
Extent of biotinylation can also be measured by streptavidin gel-shift, since streptavidin remains bound to biotin during agarose gel electrophoresis or polyacrylamide gel electrophoresis. The proportion of target biotinylated can be measured via the change in band intensity of the target with or without excess streptavidin, seen quickly and quantitatively for biotinylated proteins by Coomassie brilliant blue staining.
