= Soil steam sterilization =

Farming technique that sterilizes soil with steam

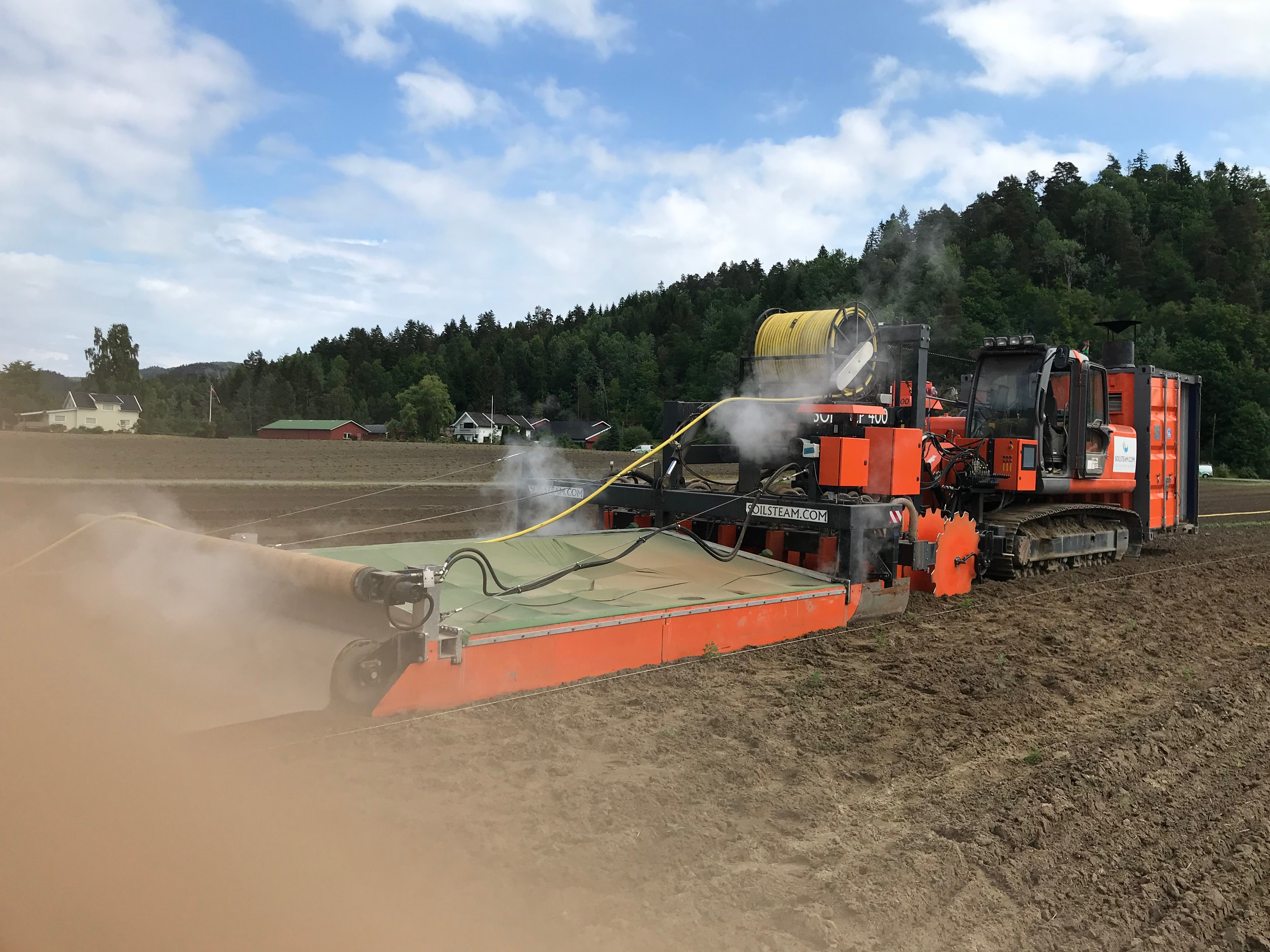
A mobile deep soil steamer prototype

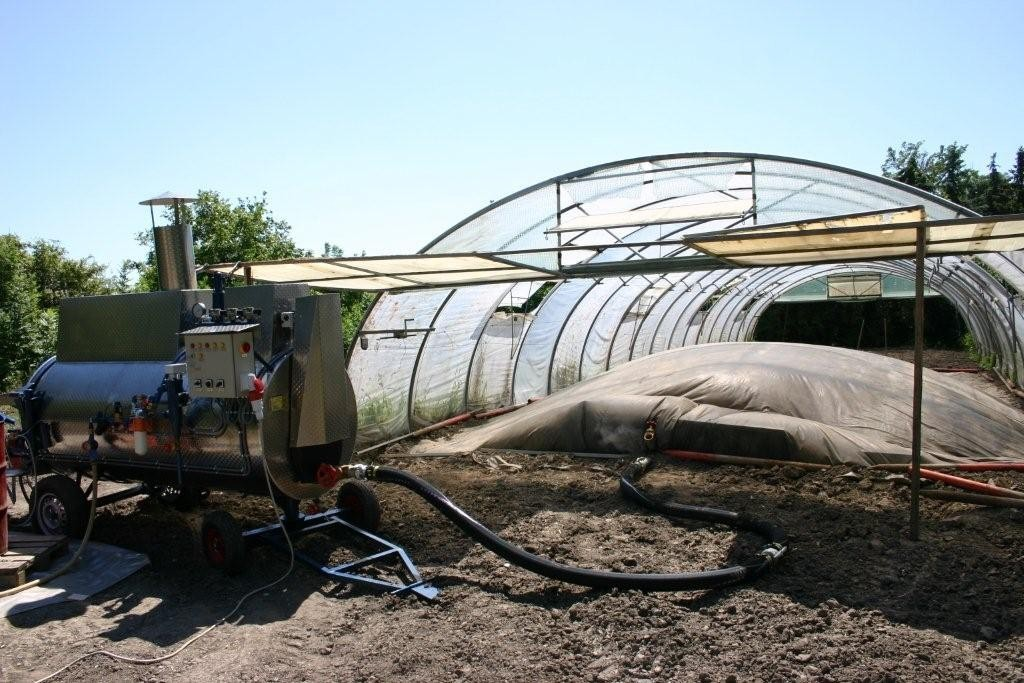
Sheet steaming with a MSD/moeschle steam boiler

Soil steam sterilization (soil steaming) is a farming technique that sterilizes or partially sterilizes soil with steam in open fields or greenhouses. Steaming leads to a better starting position, quicker growth and strengthened resistance against plant disease and pests. In recent years soil steaming has regained popularity. It is now considered the best and most effective way to disinfect sick soil, potting soil, and compost. In the 2020s, the technique started to be adapted for use in construction and in the production of technosol, to kill seeds and weeds in soil as a method of remediating invasive alien species.[1]

Steam effectively kills weeds, bacteria, fungi and viruses by heating the soil to levels that cause enzyme inactivation or the unfolding and coagulation of vital cellular proteins. Soil steaming is considered a good alternative to bromomethane, whose production and use was curtailed by the Montreal Protocol. Biologically, soil steaming is considered a partial disinfection, since heat-resistant spore-forming bacteria can survive the process and revitalize the soil after cooling.

Soil steaming is also effective for addressing soil fatigue, which is the degradation of soil health and fertility arising from improper agricultural management practices. Steaming the soil has been shown to effectively release nutritive substances blocked within fatigued soil.

Methods like "integrated steaming" can promote a target-oriented resettlement of steamed soil with beneficial organisms. In the process, the soil is first freed from all organisms and then revitalized and microbiologically buffered through the injection of a soil activator based on compost which contains a natural mixture of favorable microorganisms (e.g. Bacillus subtilis, etc.).

In the laboratory, soil steam sterilization via autoclave is an important step in agricultural research, specifically into regenerative agriculture, permaculture, and some ex situ cryopreservation. This process achieves true sterilization, completely disinfecting the soil and rendering all microorganisms, spores, viruses, fungi, and pathogens entirely inactive.

== Benefits of agricultural soil steaming ==
Soil sterilization provides secure and quick relief of soils from substances and organisms harmful to plants such as:

- Bacteria
- Viruses
- Fungi
- Nematodes
- Other pests

Further positive effects are:

- All weeds and weed seeds are killed
- Significant increase of crop yields. For example, a 2012 study found that pre-steaming oyster mushroom growing substrate resulted in “significant effects" on growth vigor, yield, and biological efficiency, with reduced time to colonize the substrate.
- Relief from soil fatigue through activation of chemical and biological reactions
- Frees blocked nutritive substances in the soil making them available for plants and fungi
- Viable alternative to methyl bromide and other critical chemicals in agriculture

== History ==
Modern soil steam sterilization was first developed in 1888 in Germany. It was first commercially used in the United States in 1893. Since then, a wide variety of steam machines have been built to disinfest both commercial greenhouse and nursery field soils. By the 1950s steam sterilization technologies had advanced from disinfestation of potting soil and greenhouse mixes to include commercial-scale tools (like steam rakes and tractor-drawn steam blades) capable of fumigating small acres of cut flowers and other high-value field crops. Today, even more effective steam technologies continue to be developed for commercial applications.

Modern steaming methods often rely on superheated steam at 180–200 °C (356–392 °F) to achieve optimal soil disinfection. Soil only absorbs a small amount of humidity. Micro organisms become active once the soil has cooled down. This creates an optimal environment for instant tillage with seedlings and seeds.

== Types of Soil Steaming In Practice ==
Different types of steam application include substrate steaming, surface steaming, and deep soil steaming.

=== Surface steaming ===
Several methods for surface steaming are in use amongst which are: area sheet steaming, the steaming hood, the steaming harrow, the steaming plough and vacuum steaming with drainage pipes or mobile pipe systems.

In order to pick the most suitable steaming method, certain factors have to be considered such as soil structure, plant culture and area performance. At present, more advanced methods are being developed, such as sandwich steaming or partially integrated sandwich steaming in order to minimize energy consumption and associated costs as much as possible.

=== Deep soil steaming ===
Deep soil steaming is a concept adopted by the Norwegian company Soil Steam International AS. They have developed a technology that gets the steam down to 30 cm deep in the soil. This is done in a continuous process and their last prototype managed to treat 1 hectare in 20 hours. When steaming the soil this deep, they get deep enough to prevent fall plowing from bringing up new seeds, fungi or nematodes. This means that the soil stays free from weeds, seeds, fungi and nematodes for many years after one deep soil steam operation.

=== Sheet steaming ===
Surface steaming with special sheets (sheet steaming) is a method which has been established for decades in order to steam large areas reaching from 15 to 400 m^{2} (160 to 4,310 ft^{2}) in one step. If properly applied, sheet steaming is simple and highly economic. The usage of heat resistant, non-decomposing insulation fleece saves up to 50% energy, reduces the steaming time significantly and improves penetration. Single working step areas up to 400 m^{2} can be steamed in 4–5 hours down to 25–30 cm (9.8–11.8 in) depth and 90 °C (194 °F). The usage of heat resistant and non-decomposing synthetic insulation fleece, 5 mm (0.20 in) thick, 500 gr / m^{2}, can reduce steaming time by about 30%. Through a steam injector or a perforated pipe, steam is injected underneath the sheet after it has been laid out and weighted with sand sacks.

The area performance in one working step depends on the capacity of the steam generator (e.g. steam boiler):

Steam capacity kg/h:	100	250	300	400	550	800	1000	1350	2000
Area m^{2}:	15–20	30–50	50–65	60–90	80–120	130–180	180–220	220–270	300–400

The steaming time depends on soil structure as well as outside temperature and amounts to 1–1.5 hours per 10 cm (3.9 in) steaming depth. Hereby the soil reaches a temperature of about 85 °C (185 °F). Milling for soil loosening is not recommended since soil structure may become too fine which reduces its penetrability for steam. The usage of spading machines is ideal for soil loosening. The best results can be achieved if the soil is cloddy at greater depth and granulated at lesser depth.

In practice, working with at least two sheets simultaneously has proven to be highly effective. While one sheet is used for steaming the other one is prepared for steam injection, therefore unnecessary steaming recesses are avoided.

=== Depth steaming with vacuum ===
Steaming with vacuum which is induced through a mobile or fixed installed pipe system in the depth of the area to be steamed, is the method that reaches the best penetration. Despite high capital cost, the fixed installation of drainage systems is reasonable for intensively used areas since steaming depths of up to 80 cm (2.6 ft) can be achieved.

In contrast to fixed installed drainage systems, pipes in mobile suction systems are on the surface. A central suction pipeline consisting of zinc-coated, fast-coupling pipes are connected in a regular spacing of 1.50 m (4.9 ft) and the ends of the hoses are pushed into the soil to the desired depth with a special tool.

The steaming area is covered with a special steaming sheet and weighted all around as with sheet steaming. The steam is injected underneath the sheet through an injector and protection tunnel. While with short areas up to 30 m (98 ft) length steam is frontally injected, with longer areas steam is induced in the middle of the sheet using a T-connection branching out to both sides. As soon as the sheet is inflated to approximately 1 m (3.3 ft) by the steam pressure, the suction turbine is switched on. First, the air in the soil is removed via the suction hoses. A partial vacuum is formed and the steam is pulled downward.

During the final phase, when the required steaming depth has been reached, the ventilator runs non-stop and surplus steam is blown out. To ensure that this surplus steam is not lost, it is fed back under the sheet. As with all other steaming systems, a post-steaming period of approximately 20–30 minutes is required. Steaming time is approximately 1 hour per 10 cm steaming depth. The steam requirement is approximately 7–8 kg/m^{2} (1.4–1.6 lb/ft^{2}).

The most important requirement, as with all steaming systems, is that the soil is well loosened before steaming, to ensure optimal penetration.

=== Negative pressure technique ===
Negative pressure technique generates appropriate soil temperature at a 60 cm (2.0 ft) depth and complete control of nematodes, fungi and weeds is achieved. In this technique, the steam is introduced under the steaming sheath and forced to enter the soil profile by a negative pressure. The negative pressure is created by a fan that sucks the air out of the soil through buried perforated polypropylene pipes. This system requires a permanent installation of perforated pipes into the soil, at a depth of at least 60 cm to be protected from plough.

=== Steaming with hoods ===
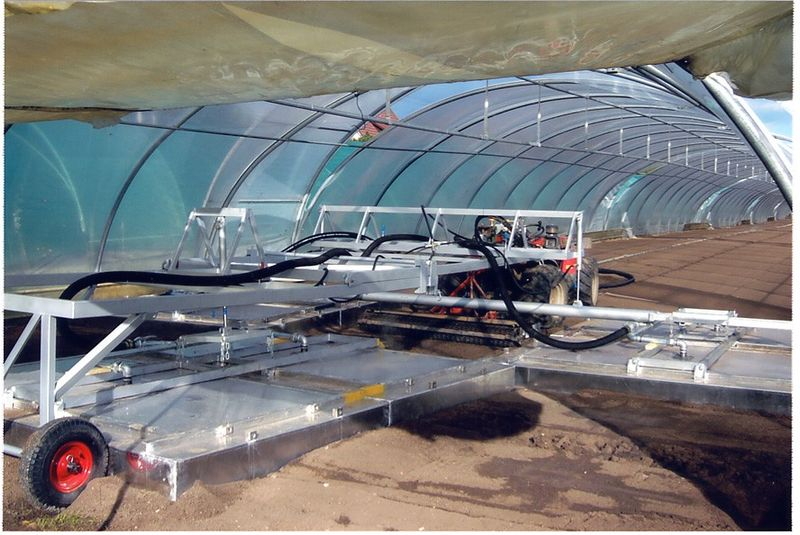
Half automatic steaming hood with three wings in greenhouse

A steaming hood is a mobile device consisting of corrosion-resistant materials such as aluminum, which is put down onto the area to be steamed. In contrast to sheet steaming, cost-intensive working steps such as laying out and weighting the sheets don't occur, however the area steamed per working step is smaller in accordance to the size of the hood.

Outdoors, a hood is positioned either manually or via tractor with a special pre-stressed 4 point suspension arm. Steaming time amounts to 30 min for a penetration down to 25 cm depth. Hereby a temperature of 90 °C can be reached. In large stable glasshouses, the hoods are attached to tracks. They are lifted and moved by pneumatic cylinders. Small and medium-sized hoods up to 12 m^{2} are lifted manually using a tipping lever or moved electrically with special winches.

=== Combined surface and depth injection of steam (Sandwich Steaming) ===
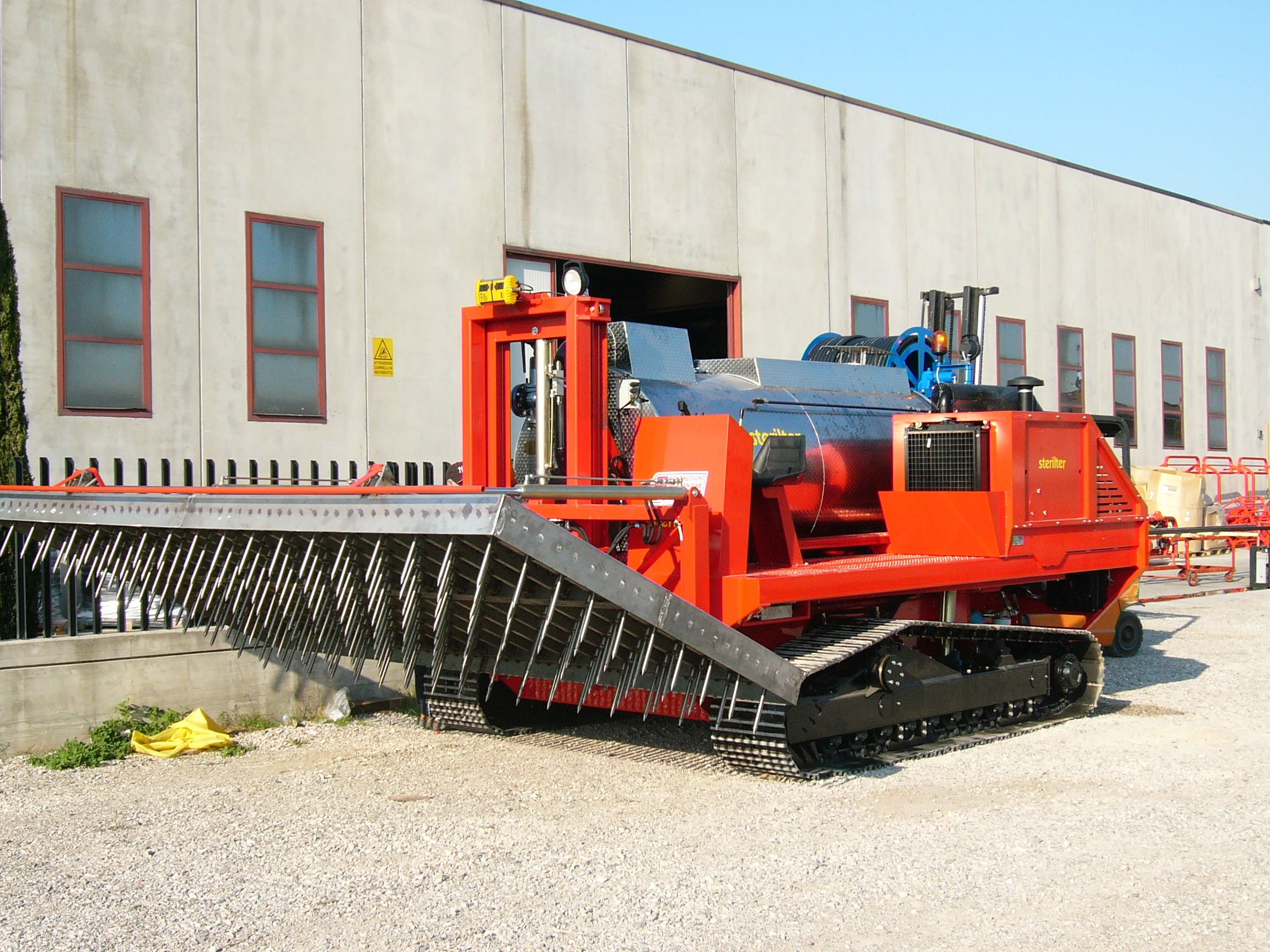
Sandwich steaming machine model Sterilter constructed by Ferrari Costruzioni Meccaniche equipped with MSD/moeschle steam boiler

Sandwich steaming, which was developed in a project among DEIAFA, University of Turin (Italy, www.deiafa.unito.it) and Ferrari Costruzioni Meccaniche (see image), represents a combination of depth and surface steaming, offers an efficient method to induce hot steam into the soil. The steam is simultaneously pushed into the soil from the surface and from the depth. For this purpose, the area, which must be equipped with a deep steaming injection system, is covered with a steaming hood. The steam enters the soil from the top and the bottom at the same time. Sheets are not suitable, since a high pressure up to 30 mm water column arises underneath the cover.

Sandwich steaming offers several advantages. On the one hand, application of energy can be increased to up to 120 kg (260 lb) of steam per 1 m^{2} (11 ft^{2}) per hour. In comparison to other steaming methods up to 30% energy savings can be achieved and the usage of fuel (e.g. heating oil) accordingly decreases. The increased application of energy leads to a quick heating of the soil which reduces the loss of heat. On the other hand, only half of the regular steaming time is needed.

Comparison of sandwich steaming with other steam injection methods relating to steam output and energy demand(*):

Steaming method	Max. steam output	Energy demand (*)
Sheet steaming	6 kg/m^{2}h	about 100 kg steam/m^{3}
Depth steaming (Sheet + vacuum)	14 kg/m^{2}h	about 120 kg steam/m^{3}
Hood steaming (Alu)	30 kg/m^{2}h	about 80 kg steam/m^{3}
Hood steaming (Steel)	50 kg/m^{2}h	about 75 kg steam/m^{3}
Sandwich steaming	120 kg/m^{2}h	about 60 kg steam/m^{3}

(*) in soil max 30% moisture

Clearly, Sandwich steaming reaches the highest steam output at the lowest energy demand.

=== Partially integrated sandwich steaming ===
The partial integrated sandwich steaming is an advanced combined method for steaming merely the areas which shall be planted and purposely leaving out those areas which shall not be used. In order to avoid risk of re-infection of steamed areas with pest from unsteamed areas, beneficial organisms can directly be injected into the steamed soil via a soil activator (e.g. special compost). The partial sandwich steaming unlocks further potential savings in the steaming process.

=== Container / Stack steaming ===
Stack steaming is used when steam treating compost and substrates such as turf. Depending on the amount, the material to be steamed is piled up to 70 cm (2.3 ft) height in steaming boxes or in small dump trailers. Steam is evenly injected via manifolds. For huge amounts, steaming containers and soil boxes are used which are equipped with suction systems to improve steaming results. Midget amounts can be steamed in special small steaming devices.

The amount of soil steamed should be tuned in a way that steaming time amounts to at most 1.5 h in order to avoid large quantities of condensed water in the bottom layers of the soil.

Steam Output kg/h:	100	250	300	400	550	800	1000	1350	2000
m^{3}/h about:	1.0–1.5	2.5–3.0	3.0–3.5	4.0–5.0	5.5–7.0	8.0–10.0	10.0–13.0	14.0–18.0	20.0–25.0

In light substrates, such as turf, the performance per hour is significantly higher.

=== Bulk steaming ===
There are several types of machines that aim to sterilize soil in a bulk process, to re

move unwanted biological organisms e.g. invasive species. Usually the soil is fed into a machine that increase the temperature of the soil and mix it. After sufficient time at threshold temperature the soils goes out of the machine. The capacity is usually several tons per hour.

== Application of steam in agriculture ==
- In horticulture as well as nurseries for sterilization of substrates and top soil
- In agriculture for sterilization and treatment of food waste for pig fattening and heating of molasses
- In mushroom cultivation for pasteurization of growing rooms, sterilization of substrate, and combined application as heating (although this lattermost use, sometimes called "steam recycling," is controversial because waste steam from sterilization processes can carry viable spores and pathogens)
- In wineries as combination boiler for sterilization and cleaning of storage tanks, tempering of mash, and for warm water generation
- In agricultural research into phytoremediation, permaculture, plant conservation, and higher-yield farming methods
- In environmental remediation for treatment of soil contaminated with invasive species.
