= Idraparinux =

Chemical compound

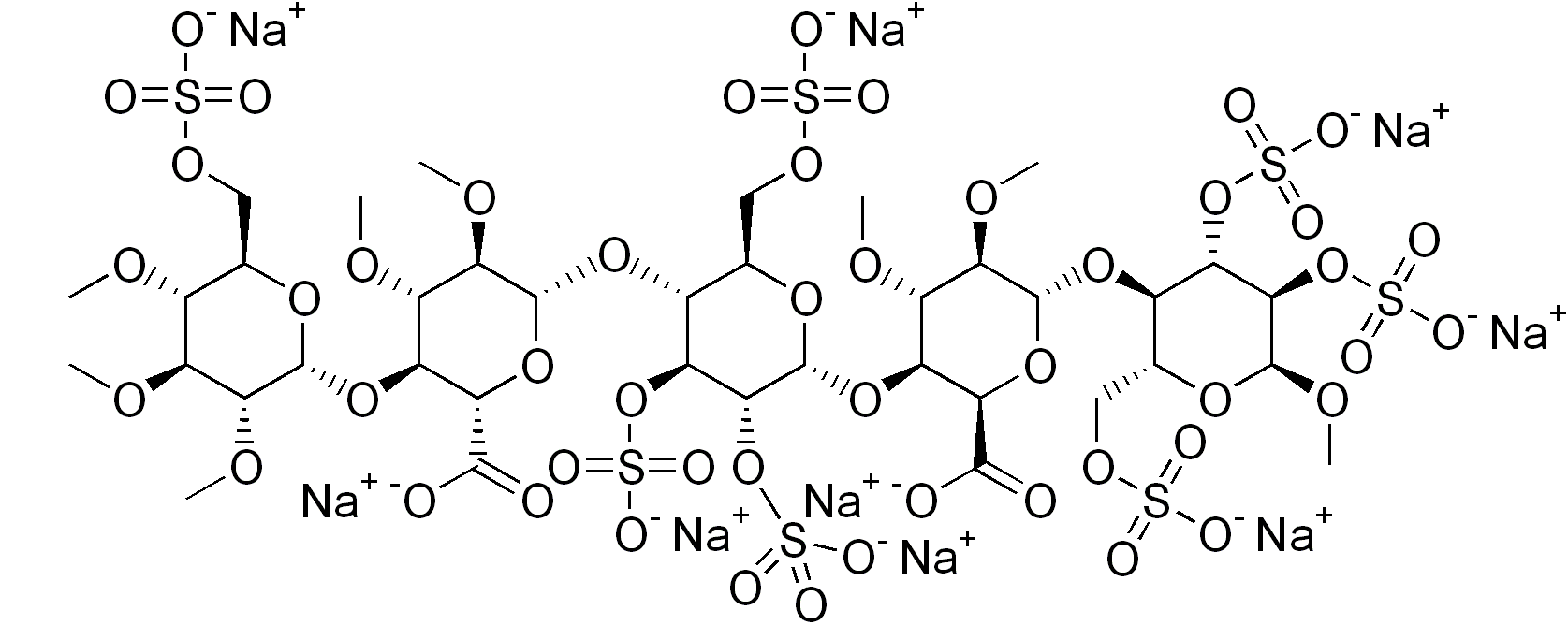

Clinical data
- Routes of administration: Subcutaneous
- ATC code: none

Legal status
- Legal status: Investigational

Pharmacokinetic data
- Elimination half-life: 80-130 hours

Identifiers
- IUPAC name: Nonasodium (2S,3S,4S,5R,6R)-6-[(2R,3R,4S,5R,6R)-6-
- CAS Number: 162610-17-5
- PubChem CID: 3083444
- ChemSpider: 2340656
- UNII: 6ADD3H8MFZ

Chemical and physical data
- Formula: C_{38}H_{55}Na_{9}O_{49}S_{7}
- Molar mass: 1727.14 g·mol^{−1}
- 3D model (JSmol): Interactive image
- SMILES: CO[C@@H]1[C@H](O[C@@H]([C@@H]([C@H]1OC)OC)O[C@H]2[C@@H]([C@H]([C@@H](O[C@@H]2C(=O)[O-])O[C@@H]3[C@H](O[C@@H]([C@@H]([C@H]3OS(=O)(=O)[O-])OS(=O)(=O)[O-])O[C@H]4[C@@H]([C@H]([C@@H](O[C@H]4C(=O)[O-])O[C@@H]5[C@H](O[C@@H]([C@@H]([C@H]5OS(=O)(=O)[O-])OS(=O)(=O)[O-])OC)COS(=O)(=O)[O-])OC)OC)COS(=O)(=O)[O-])OC)OC)COS(=O)(=O)[O-].[Na+].[Na+].[Na+].[Na+].[Na+].[Na+].[Na+].[Na+].[Na+]
- InChI: InChI=1S/C38H64O49S7.9Na/c1-64-15-12(9-72-88(43,44)45)76-35(27(68-5)18(15)65-2)80-21-19(66-3)28(69-6)37(82-25(21)32(39)40)79-17-14(11-74-90(49,50)51)77-38(31(87-94(61,62)63)24(17)85-92(55,56)57)81-22-20(67-4)29(70-7)36(83-26(22)33(41)42)78-16-13(10-73-89(46,47)48)75-34(71-8)30(86-93(58,59)60)23(16)84-91(52,53)54;;;;;;;;;/h12-31,34-38H,9-11H2,1-8H3,(H,39,40)(H,41,42)(H,43,44,45)(H,46,47,48)(H,49,50,51)(H,52,53,54)(H,55,56,57)(H,58,59,60)(H,61,62,63);;;;;;;;;/q;9*+1/p-9/t12-,13-,14-,15-,16-,17-,18+,19+,20+,21+,22+,23+,24+,25+,26-,27-,28-,29-,30-,31-,34+,35-,36-,37-,38-;;;;;;;;;/m1........./s1; Key:MVPQUSQUURLQKF-MCPDASDXSA-E

Idraparinux sodium is an anticoagulant medication in development by Sanofi-Aventis.

It has a similar chemical structure and the same method of action as fondaparinux, but with an elimination half-life about five to six times longer (an increase from fondaparinux's 17 hours to approximately 80 hours), which means that the drug should only need to be injected once a week. Supriya Dey et al recently reported shortest chemical synthesis of Idraparinux for the large-scale production.

Sanofi discontinued the development of idraparinux sodium.

== Negative clinical trial ==
A phase III trial of idraparinux sodium for stroke prevention in patients with AF (AMADEUS) was halted prematurely due to excessive clinically relevant and intracranial bleeding. Bleedings were particularly increased in elderly patients and those with renal impairment. Sanofi discontinued the development of idraparinux sodium in favour of a biotinylated formulation of the drug called idrabiotaparinux sodium.

== Method of action ==
Idraparinux selectively blocks coagulation factor Xa.

See Heparin: Mechanism of anticoagulant action for a comparison of the mechanism of heparin, low-molecular-weight heparins, fondaparinux and idraparinux.

== Idrabiotaparinux ==
Idrabiotaparinux sodium is also administered once-weekly. It has the same pentasaccharidic structure as idraparinux sodium, but with biotin attached, which allows its neutralisation with avidin, an egg-derived protein with low antigenicity. Sanofi conducted three phase III trials of idrabiotaparinux sodium between 2006 and 2008 in approximately 13,550 patients. In one phase III trial (the BOREALIS-AF study), idrabiotaparinux sodium was non-inferior to warfarin in preventing the recurrent venous thromboembolism at three months in patients with pulmonary embolism and the incidence of clinically relevant bleeding was lower in the idrabiotaparinux sodium arm. The drug was expected to be filed for stroke prevention in patients with atrial fibrillation in 2011. The study was prematurely terminated, and the reason remains unclear. However, Sanofi has since discontinued its development. The company announced in May 2011 that the drug is available for licensing. A systematic review found that until now there is not sufficient evidence to clarify whether idraparinux or idrabiotaparinux are as effective and safe as the standard warfarin treatment for venous thromboembolism prevention. Idraparinux or idrabiotaparinux decreased major bleeding rate significantly but had a trend to increase the all-cause mortality compared with warfarin.
