= Streptomyces avidinii =

Scientific classification
- Domain: Bacteria
- Kingdom: Bacillati
- Phylum: Actinomycetota
- Class: Actinomycetes
- Order: Streptomycetales
- Family: Streptomycetaceae
- Genus: Streptomyces
- Species: S. avidinii

Binomial name
- Streptomyces avidinii Stapley et al. 1964

Type strain
- AS 4.1583, ATCC 27419, BCRC 13384, BIO K-172, CBS 730.72, CCRC 13384, CCUG 54639, CGMCC 4.1583, CNCTC 7369, DSM 40526, IFO 13429, IMET 43538, ISP 5526, JCM 4726, KCC S-0726, KCCM 11844, KCCS-0726, KCTC 9757, MA-833, MTCC 1808, NBRC 13429, NCIMB 11996, NRRL 3077, NRRL-ISP 5526, PCM 2342, RIA 1390, VKM Ac-1074, VTT E-73016

Species of bacterium

Streptomyces avidinii is a bacterium species from the genus of Streptomyces which produces streptavidin.

== See also ==
- List of Streptomyces species
