= Affinity label =

Affinity labels are a class of enzyme inhibitors that covalently bind to their target causing its inactivation. The hallmark of an affinity label is the use of a targeting moiety to specifically and reversibly deliver a weakly reactive group to the enzyme that irreversibly binds to an amino acid residue. The targeting portion of the label often resembles the enzyme's natural substrate so that a similar mode of noncovalent binding is used prior to the covalent linkage. Their usefulness in medicine can be limited by the specificity of the first noncovalent binding step whereas indiscriminate action can be utilized for purposes such as affinity labeling - a technique for the validation of substrate-specific binding of compounds.

These labels are not limited to enzymes but may also be designed to react with antibodies or ribozymes although this usage is less common. Although proteins such as hemoglobin do not have an active site, binding pockets can be exploited for their affinity and thus be labeled.

== Classifications ==
Affinity labels can be broken down into three distinct categories based on their reactive groups and mode of delivery.

=== Classical affinity labels ===
This category encompasses the simplest approach of coupling an electrophile with low intrinsic reactivity to a noncovalent binding moiety which frequently mimics the natural substrate. Key to this designation is that the reactivity of the electrophile is not altered by the enzyme and that the noncovalent binding moiety serves to increase the presence and lifetime of the electrophile in the active site (effective molarity). The weakly reactive group may react with functional groups outside of the active site or on other proteins but the selectivity is conferred by the noncovalent binding moiety. Kinetic signatures of this type of inhibitor can be found in saturation because of the covalent reaction (kinact) becomes the rate limiting step at high concentrations of inhibitor. A handful of drugs such as afatinib have gained FDA approval through this approach. The inverse approach of using a weakly nucleophilic inhibitor to attack a protein-bound electrophile has also been studied. This approach has received much less attention due to the lack of protein electrophiles and only those with suitable cofactors can be targeted.

=== Quiescent affinity labels ===
Quiescent affinity labels represent a promising approach for inhibiting enzymes using ‘masked’ reactive functionalities that are only uncovered within the active site. This approach differs from mechanism-based inactivators in that the catalysis must be "off-pathway". One of the best examples to explain this form of catalysis is in the inactivation dimethylargine dimethylaminohydrolase (DDAH) by 4-halopyridines. At physiological pH, the 4-halo group has near negligible reactivity with thiolates but upon protonation of the nitrogen, the reactivity increases ~4500-fold. This protonation occurs off-pathway by an aspartate residue that is not normally involved in catalysis. Following attack by the active site cysteine and loss of the halide, the enzyme is irreversibly modified. This requirement of catalysis tunes the selectivity of modification. This class is not limited to halopyridines and functional groups including epoxides and peptidyl acyloxymethyl ketones have been used. The kinetic signature of this class resembles that of classical affinity labels. This term has been previously used to describe affinity labels that contain weakly reactive groups but recent literature has commenced on the requirement of off-pathway catalysis.

=== Photoaffinity labels ===
Photoaffinity labels are characterized by nonenzymatic reactivity produced by exposure to light and a noncovalent targeting moiety to enhance the effective molarity of this reactive group in the active site. While this technique appears sound in theory, low degree of labeling is frequently observed primarily due to quenching of the reactive species by solvent or other species in solution. However, this quenching can be advantageous as it is such a fast process that once the reactive species is formed, it will not diffuse to any appreciable extent and will only react with molecules to which it is immediately adjacent.

Photoaffinity labels do not show great promise for inhibition or in the use of drugs but are appropriately suited to identify ligand binding sites. Reactive groups such as nitrenes or 2-aryl-5-carboxytetrazoles are often employed to generate highly reactive, nonselective carbenes or moderately selective nitrile-imine intermediates, respectively.

== Uses of affinity labeling ==
When characterizing an enzyme, it is essential to identify the amino acid residues responsible for catalysis. While it is clear that X-ray crystallography will provide more detailed 3-D information about the active site, only a static picture is returned and difficulties can be encountered with co-crystallization of the substrate or mimics due to enzymatic turnover.

The classic example of the use of affinity labels for this purpose is in mapping the topography of the active site of chymotrypsin. Through the use of three different affinity labels that placed reactive groups (halomethyl ketones or phosphofluorides) on different regions of the natural substrate core, the relative positions and identity of three different amino acids could be determined. Another notable example of using affinity labeling to determine the active site of an enzyme is the work carried out by Grachev et al. which resulted in characterization of the β-subunit of the core RNA polymerase as the sub-unit responsible for phosphodiester-bond formation in the process of prokaryotic transcription.

=== Activity-based protein profiling (ABPP) ===
The basic unit of activity-based proteomics is the probe, which typically consists of two elements: a reactive group (RG, sometimes called a "warhead") and a tag. Additionally, some probes may contain a binding group which enhances selectivity. The reactive group usually contains a specially designed electrophile that becomes covalently-linked to a nucleophilic residue in the active site of an active enzyme. An enzyme that is inhibited or post-translationally modified will not react with an activity-based probe. The tag may be either a reporter such as a fluorophore or an affinity label such as biotin or an alkyne or azide for use with the Huisgen 1,3-dipolar cycloaddition (also known as click chemistry).

== See also ==
- Suicide inhibition
