= Log reduction =

Measure of decontamination

Log reduction is a measure of how thoroughly a decontamination process reduces the concentration of a contaminant. It is defined as the common logarithm of the ratio of the levels of contamination before and after the process, so an increment of 1 corresponds to a reduction in concentration by a factor of 10. In general, an n-log reduction means that the concentration of remaining contaminants is only 10^{−n} times that of the original. So for example, a 0-log reduction is no reduction at all, while a 1-log reduction corresponds to a reduction of 90 percent from the original concentration, and a 2-log reduction corresponds to a reduction of 99 percent from the original concentration.

== Mathematical definition ==
Let c_{b} and c_{a} be the numerical values of the concentrations of a given contaminant, respectively before and after treatment, following a defined process. It is irrelevant in what units these concentrations are given, provided that both use the same units.

Then an R-log reduction is achieved, where

$$R=\log_{10}{c_\mathrm{b}}-\log_{10}{c_\mathrm{a}}=-\log_{10}{\left(\frac{c_\mathrm{a}}{c_\mathrm{b}}\right)}$$.

For the purpose of presentation, the value of R is rounded down to a desired precision, usually to a whole number.

Example

Let the concentration of some contaminant be 580 ppm before and 0.725 ppm after treatment. Then

$$R=-\log_{10}{\left(\frac{0.725}{580}\right)}=-\log_{10}{0.00125}\approx 2.903$$

Rounded down, R is 2, so a 2-log reduction is achieved.

Conversely, an R-log reduction means that a reduction by a factor of 10^{R} has been achieved.

== Log reduction and percentage reduction ==
Reduction is often expressed as a percentage. The closer it is to 100%, the better. Letting c_{b} and c_{a} be as before, a reduction by P % is achieved, where

$P = 100~\times~\frac{c_\mathrm{b} - c_\mathrm{a}}{c_\mathrm{b}}.$
Example

Let, as in the earlier example, the concentration of some contaminant be 580 ppm before and 0.725 ppm after treatment. Then

$$P~=~100~\times~\frac{580 - 0.725}{580}~=~100~\times~0.99875~=~99.875.$$

So this is (better than) a 99% reduction, but not yet quite a 99.9% reduction.

The following table summarizes the most common cases.

Log reduction	Percentage
1-log reduction	90%
2-log reduction	99%
3-log reduction	99.9%
4-log reduction	99.99%
5-log reduction	99.999%

In general, if R is a whole number, an R-log reduction corresponds to a percentage reduction with R leading digits "9" in the percentage (provided that it is at least 10%).

== See also ==
- Decimal reduction time
