= D-value (microbiology) =

Time (or dose of an antimicrobial) required to kill 90% microbes

In microbiology, in the context of a sterilization procedure, the D-value or decimal reduction time (or decimal reduction dose) is the time (or dose of an antimicrobial drug) required, at a given condition (e.g. temperature) or set of conditions, to achieve a one-log reduction, that is, to kill 90% of relevant microorganisms. A D-value is denoted with the capital letter "D". Thus, after an exposure time of 1 D, only 10% of the organisms originally present in a microbial colony would remain. The term originated in assessments of microbes' thermal resistance and in thermal death time analysis; however, it now has analogous uses in other microbial resistance and death rate applications, such as for ethylene oxide and radiation processing.

== Details ==
Use of D-values is based on the assumption that the procedure in question causes the number of living microorganisms to decay exponentially. From this perspective, D-values can be understood as roughly analogous to half lives of radioactive substances, however a half life involves a reduction of 50% rather than 90%. The half life is actually roughly 30% (log_{10}2 ≈ 30.103%) of the D-value, so if D = 10 minutes, the number of living microorganisms will be halved in about 3 minutes.

Generally, each lot of a sterilization-resistant organism will have its own specific D-value. Determining a D-value requires an experiment, but only gives the D-value under the specific conditions of that experiment. D-values are unique to the conditions of the environment that the bacteria currently exists in.

In the context of thermal analysis it is typical practice to subscript the "D" with an indication of temperature. For example, given a hypothetical organism which is reduced by 90% after exposure to temperatures of 150° C for 20 minutes, the D-value would be written as D_{150C} = 20 minutes. In the US, the temperature is usually indicated in degrees Fahrenheit; a notation like D_{230} should be understood to mean D_{230F} (D_{110C}). When describing D-value generally for any temperature, like in the heading of a table, a common abbreviation is D_{T} (where T stands for the temperature), where specific values for T may be given elsewhere. A numeric subscript may also be used to indicate some other level of reduction than 90%; for example, D_{10} denotes the time required for a 10% reduction.

D-values are sometimes used to express a disinfectant's efficiency in reducing the number of microbes present in a given environment.

== See also ==
- Food microbiology
- Pasteurisation
- Sterilisation
- z-value
