= 2-Iminothiolane =

Free base form	Hydrochloride form

Names
- Preferred IUPAC name Thiolan-2-imine
- Other names: Traut's reagent; 2-Thiolanimine

Identifiers
CAS Number	6539-14-6; (HCl): 4781-83-3
3D model (JSmol)	Interactive image; (HCl): Interactive image
ChemSpider	10661959; (HCl): 10732937
EC Number	(HCl): 800-330-2
PubChem CID	433941; (HCl): 13166855
UNII	5FP46MY9AM; (HCl): W688HZV733
CompTox Dashboard (EPA)	DTXSID30984006; (HCl): DTXSID60524217
- InChI: InChI=1S/C4H7NS/c5-4-2-1-3-6-4/h5H,1-3H2 Key: CNHYKKNIIGEXAY-UHFFFAOYSA-N; (HCl): InChI=1S/C4H7NS.ClH/c5-4-2-1-3-6-4;/h5H,1-3H2;1H Key: ATGUDZODTABURZ-UHFFFAOYSA-N
- SMILES: C1CC(=N)SC1; (HCl): C1CC(=N)SC1.Cl

Properties
Chemical formula	C_{4}H_{7}NS; C_{4}H_{7}NS·HCl
Molar mass	101.17 (free base); 137.63 (HCl)
Appearance	Powder
Melting point	198–201 °C (388–394 °F; 471–474 K) (HCl)
Solubility in water	100 mg/mL (HCl)
- Except where otherwise noted, data are given for materials in their standard state (at 25 °C [77 °F], 100 kPa). Infobox references

2-Iminothiolane is a cyclic thioimidate compound also known as Traut's reagent. It is a thiolating reagent that reacts with primary amine groups, such as those of amino acids, to form sulfhydryl groups.

== Application ==
2-Iminothiolane reacts with primary amines efficiently at pH 7 to 9, creating amidine compounds with a sulfhydryl group. Thus it allows for crosslinking or labeling of molecules such as proteins through use of disulfide or thioether conjugation. It was first used to thiolate a subunit of ribosome in E. coli in 1973 by Robert Traut, its namesake, and his colleagues.

It also reacts with aliphatic and phenolic hydroxyl groups at high pH, though at a much slower rate.

The reaction of 2-iminothiolane with an amine group of a peptide.
