= Z-value (temperature) =

Term used in microbial thermal death time calculations

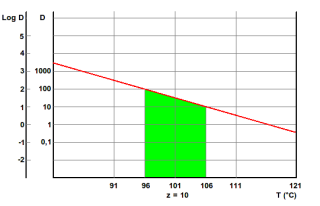
Semi-logarithmic graph for the determination of z-value

Z-value is a term used in microbial thermal death time calculations. It is the number of degrees the temperature has to be increased to achieve a tenfold (i.e. 1 log_{10}) reduction in the D-value. The D-value of an organism is the time required in a given medium, at a given temperature, for a ten-fold reduction in the number of organisms. It is useful when examining the effectiveness of thermal inactivations under different conditions, for example in food cooking and preservation. The z-value is a measure of the change of the D-value with varying temperature, and is a simplified version of an Arrhenius equation and it is equivalent to z=2.303 RT T_{ref}/E.

The z-value of an organism in a particular medium is the temperature change required for the D-value to change by a factor of ten, or put another way, the temperature required for the thermal destruction curve to move one log cycle. It is the reciprocal of the slope resulting from the plot of the logarithm of the D-value versus the temperature at which the D-value was obtained. While the D-value gives the time needed at a certain temperature to kill 90% of the organisms, the z-value relates the resistance of an organism to differing temperatures. The z-value allows calculation of the equivalency of two thermal processes, if the D-value and the z-value are known.

Example: if it takes an increase of 10 °C (18 °F) to move the curve one log, then our z-value is 10. Given a D-value of 4.5 minutes at 150 °C, the D-value can be calculated for 160 °C by reducing the time by 1 log. The new D-value for 160 °C given the z-value is 0.45 minutes. This means that each 10 °C (18 °F) increase in temperature will reduce our D-value by 1 log. Conversely, a 10 °C (18 °F) decrease in temperature will increase our D-value by 1 log. So, the D-value for a temperature of 140 °C would be 45 minutes.

"F_{0}" is defined as the number of equivalent minutes of steam sterilization at temperature 121.1 °C (250 °F) delivered to a container or unit of product calculated using a z-value of 10 °C. The term F-value or "F_{Tref/z}" is defined as the equivalent number of minutes to a certain reference temperature (T_{ref}) for a certain control microorganism with an established Z-value.

== See also ==
- Pasteurisation
- Food microbiology
- Sterilisation
