= Streptavidin =

Protein in Streptomyces avidinii

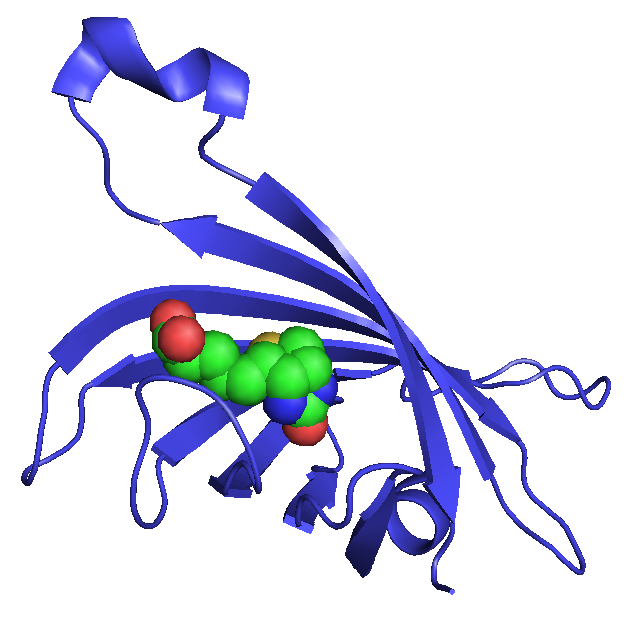
- Structure of a single monomer from the streptavidin tetramer (ribbon diagram) with bound biotin (spheres); PDB: 1STP

Identifiers
- Organism: Streptomyces avidinii
- Symbol: ?
- Orthologs: OMA: entry
- UniProt: P22629
Search for
- Structures: Swiss-model
- Domains: InterPro

Streptavidin /ˌstrɛpˈtævɪdɪn/ is a 52 kDa protein (tetramer) purified from the bacterium Streptomyces avidinii. Streptavidin homo-tetramers have an extraordinarily high affinity for biotin (also known as vitamin B7 or vitamin H). With a dissociation constant (K_{d}) on the order of ≈10^{−14} mol/L, the binding of biotin to streptavidin is one of the strongest non-covalent interactions known in nature. Streptavidin is used extensively in molecular biology and bionanotechnology due to the streptavidin-biotin complex's resistance to organic solvents, denaturants (e.g. guanidinium chloride), detergents (e.g. SDS, Triton X-100), proteolytic enzymes, and extremes of temperature and pH.

== Structure ==
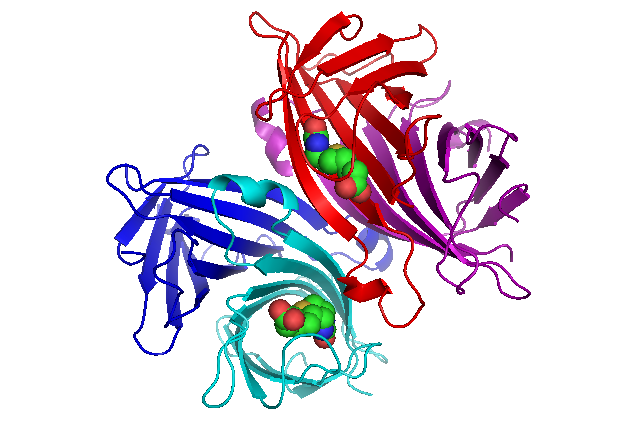
Tetrameric structure of streptavidin with 2 bound biotins

The crystal structure of streptavidin with biotin bound was reported by two groups in 1989. The structure was solved using multi wavelength anomalous diffraction by Hendrickson et al. at Columbia University and using multiple isomorphous replacement by Weber et al. at E. I. DuPont Central Research and Development Department. As of March 2025, there are 298 structures deposited in the Protein Data Bank. See this link for a complete list. The N and C termini of the 159 residue full-length protein are processed to give a shorter ‘core’ streptavidin, usually composed of residues 13–139; removal of the N and C termini is necessary for the highest biotin-binding affinity. The secondary structure of a streptavidin monomer is composed of eight antiparallel β-strands, which fold to give an antiparallel β-barrel tertiary structure. A biotin binding-site is located at one end of each β-barrel. Four identical streptavidin monomers (i.e. four identical β-barrels) associate to give streptavidin's tetrameric quaternary structure. The biotin binding-site in each barrel consists of residues from the interior of the barrel, together with a conserved Trp120 from a neighboring subunit. In this way, each subunit contributes to the binding site on the neighboring subunit, and so the tetramer can also be considered a dimer of functional dimers.

== Origins of the high affinity ==
The numerous crystal structures of the streptavidin-biotin complex have shed light on the origins of the remarkable affinity. Firstly, there is high shape-complementarity between the binding pocket and biotin. Secondly, there is an extensive network of hydrogen bonds formed to biotin when in the binding site. There are eight hydrogen bonds directly made to residues in the binding site (the so-called 'first shell' of hydrogen bonding), involving residues Asn23, Tyr43, Ser27, Ser45, Asn49, Ser88, Thr90 and Asp128. There is also a 'second shell' of hydrogen bonding involving residues that interact with the first shell residues. However, the streptavidin-biotin affinity exceeds that which would be predicted from the hydrogen bonding interactions alone, suggesting another mechanism contributing to the high affinity. The biotin-binding pocket is hydrophobic, and there are numerous van der Waals force-mediated contacts and hydrophobic interactions made to the biotin when in the pocket, which is also thought to account for the high affinity. In particular, the pocket is lined with conserved tryptophan residues. Lastly, biotin binding is accompanied by the stabilisation of a flexible loop connecting β-strands 3 and 4 (L3/4), which closes over the bound biotin, acting like a 'lid' over the binding pocket and contributing to the extremely slow biotin dissociation rate.

Most attempts at mutating streptavidin result in a lowered biotin-binding affinity, which is to be expected in such a highly optimized system. However, an engineered mutant of streptavidin, named traptavidin, was found to have more than ten-fold slower biotin dissociation, in addition to higher thermal and mechanical stability. This decreased dissociation rate was accompanied by a two-fold decrease in the association rate.

Biotin-binding affinity can be impaired by chemical labeling of streptavidin, such as with amine-reactive fluorophores; flavidin is a streptavidin mutant without lysine side-chains, which retains good biotin binding characteristics after such fluorescent dye labeling where the dye couples to the amino terminus.

== Uses in biotechnology ==
Among the most common uses of streptavidin are the purification or detection of various biomolecules. The strong streptavidin-biotin interaction can be used to attach various biomolecules to one another or onto a solid support. Harsh conditions are needed to break the streptavidin-biotin interaction, which often denatures the protein of interest being purified. However, it has been shown that a short incubation in water above 70 °C will reversibly break the interaction (at least for biotinylated DNA) without denaturing streptavidin, allowing re-use of the streptavidin solid support. A further application of streptavidin is for purification and detection of proteins genetically modified with the Strep-tag peptide. Streptavidin is widely used in Western blotting and immunoassays conjugated to some reporter molecule, such as horseradish peroxidase. Streptavidin has also been used in the developing field of Nanobiotechnology, the use of biological molecules such as proteins or lipids to create nanoscale devices/structures. In this context streptavidin can be used as a building block to link biotinylated DNA molecules to create single walled carbon nanotube scaffolds or even complex DNA polyhedra. The tetrameric streptavidin has also been used as a hub around which other proteins may be arranged, either by an affinity tag such as Strep-tag or AviTag or by genetic fusion to SpyTag. Fusion to SpyTag allowed generation of assemblies with 8 or 20 streptavidin subunits. As well as a molecular force probe for atomic force microscopy studies, novel materials such as 3D crystalline lattices have also been created. Streptavidin has a mildly acidic isoelectric point (pI) of ~5, but a recombinant form of streptavidin with a near-neutral pI is also commercially available.

Pretargeted Immunotherapy

Pretargeted immunotherapy uses streptavidin conjugated to a monoclonal antibody against cancer cell-specific antigens followed by an injection of radiolabelled biotin to deliver the radiation only to the cancerous cell. Initial hurdles involve saturation of the biotin binding sites on streptavidin with endogenous biotin instead of the injected radiolabelled biotin, and a high degree of radioactive exposure in the kidneys due to streptavidin's strong cell adsorptive properties. It is currently thought that this high level of binding to adherent cell types, such as activated platelets and melanomas, is a result of integrin binding mediated through the RYD sequence in streptavidin.

== Variants with a controlled number of binding sites ==
Monovalent vs. monomeric

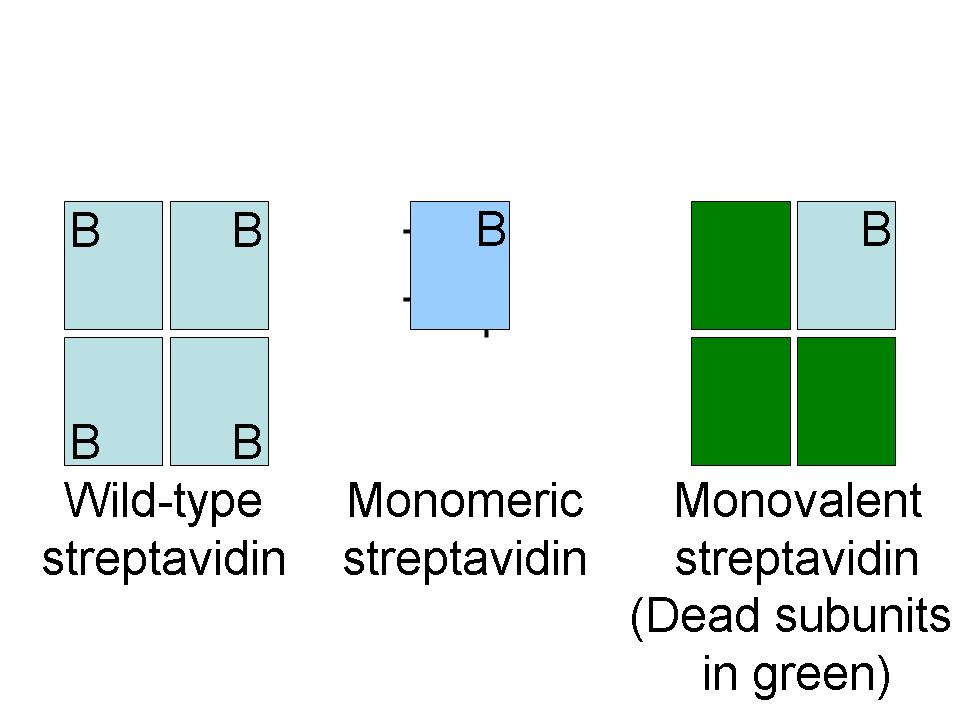
Schematic comparing monovalent and monomeric streptavidin

Streptavidin is a tetramer and each subunit binds biotin with equal affinity. Multivalency is an advantage in applications like MHC tetramer staining, where avidity effects improve the ability of MHC molecules attached to streptavidin to detect specific T cells. In other cases, such as the use of streptavidin for imaging specific proteins on cells, multivalency can perturb the function of the protein of interest. Monovalent streptavidin is an engineered recombinant form of streptavidin which is a tetramer but only one of the four binding sites is functional. This single binding site has 10^{−14} mol/L affinity and cannot cause cross-linking. Applications of monovalent streptavidin have included fluorescent tracking of cell surface receptors, decorating DNA origami, and acting as a pointer to identify specific regions for cryo-electron microscopy.

Monomeric streptavidin is a recombinant form of streptavidin with mutations to break the tetramer into a monomer and to enhance the solubility of the resultant isolated subunit. Monomeric streptavidin versions have an affinity for biotin of 10^{−7} mol/L 10^{−8} mol/L and so are not ideal for labeling applications but are useful for purification, where reversibility is desirable.

Divalent

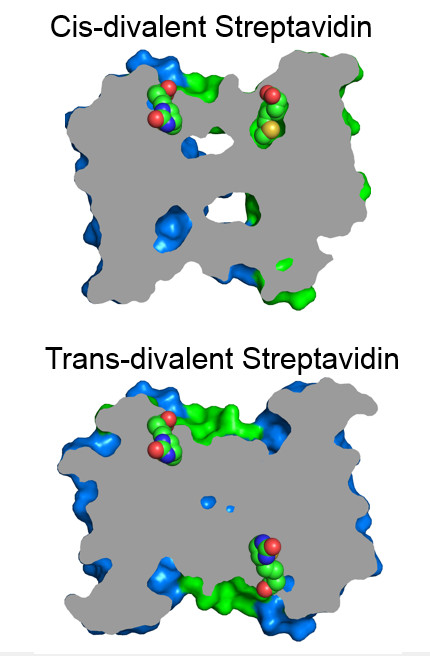
Slice through protein comparing biotin orientation in cis-divalent and trans-divalent streptavidin

A streptavidin with exactly two biotin binding sites per tetramer can be produced by refolding together from denaturant of subunits with and without a functional biotin binding site and then purification of the folded tetramers by ion-exchange chromatography. The functional binding sites here have the same biotin binding stability as wild-type streptavidin. Divalent streptavidin with the two biotin binding sites together (cis-divalent) or apart (trans-divalent) can be separately purified.

Trivalent

A streptavidin with exactly three biotin binding sites per tetramer can also be produced using the same principle as to produce divalent streptavidins.

High-valency streptavidins

Streptavidins of higher valency has been obtained by utilizing the chemistry of isopeptide bond conjugation using the SpyTag/SpyCatcher technology. This involves having a streptavidin tetramer with three biotin binding sites and a dead streptavidin fused to either SpyTag or SpyCatcher. When the different tetramers are mixed together, a covalent linkage occurs to enable higher number of biotin binding sites. Six and twelve biotin binding sites per molecule have been made with this method.

== Comparison to avidin ==
Streptavidin is not the only protein capable of binding to biotin with high affinity. Avidin is the other most notable biotin-binding protein. Originally isolated from egg yolk, avidin only has 30% sequence identity to streptavidin, but almost identical secondary, tertiary and quaternary structure. Avidin has a higher affinity for biotin (K_{d} ~ 10^{−15} M) but in contrast to streptavidin, avidin is glycosylated, positively charged, has pseudo-catalytic activity (avidin can enhance the alkaline hydrolysis of an ester linkage between biotin and a nitrophenyl group) and has a higher tendency for aggregation. On the other hand, streptavidin is the better biotin-conjugate binder; avidin has a lower binding affinity than streptavidin when biotin is conjugated to another molecule, despite avidin having the higher affinity for free, unconjugated biotin. Because streptavidin lacks any carbohydrate modification and has a near-neutral pI, it has the advantage of much lower nonspecific binding than avidin. Deglycosylated avidin (NeutrAvidin) is more comparable to the size, pI, and low nonspecific binding of streptavidin.

== See also ==
- Protein tag
