= Hematology analyzer =

To count and identify blood cells at high speed and accuracy

Hematology analyzers (also spelled haematology analysers in British English) are used to count and identify blood cells at high speed with accuracy. During the 1950s, laboratory technicians counted each individual blood cell underneath a microscope. Tedious and inconsistent, this was replaced with the first, very basic hematology analyzer, engineered by Wallace H. Coulter. The early hematology analyzers relied on Coulter's principle (see Coulter counter). However, they have evolved to encompass numerous techniques.

== Uses ==
Hematology analyzers are used to conduct a complete blood count (CBC), which is usually the first test requested by physicians to determine a patient's general health status. A complete blood count includes red blood cell (RBC), white blood cell (WBC), hemoglobin, and platelet counts, as well as hematocrit levels. Other analyses include:

- RBC distribution width
- Mean corpuscular volume
- Mean corpuscular hemoglobin
- Mean corpuscular hemoglobin concentrations
- WBC differential count in percentage and absolute value
- Platelet distribution width
- Platelet mean volume
- Large platelet cell ratio
- Platelet criteria

== Techniques ==
- Flow cytometry
- Spectrophotometry
- Absorption spectroscopy
- Transmission Turbidimetry
- Electrical impedance (Coulter's principle)
- Digital microscopy with AI

== Types ==
=== 3-part differential cell counter ===
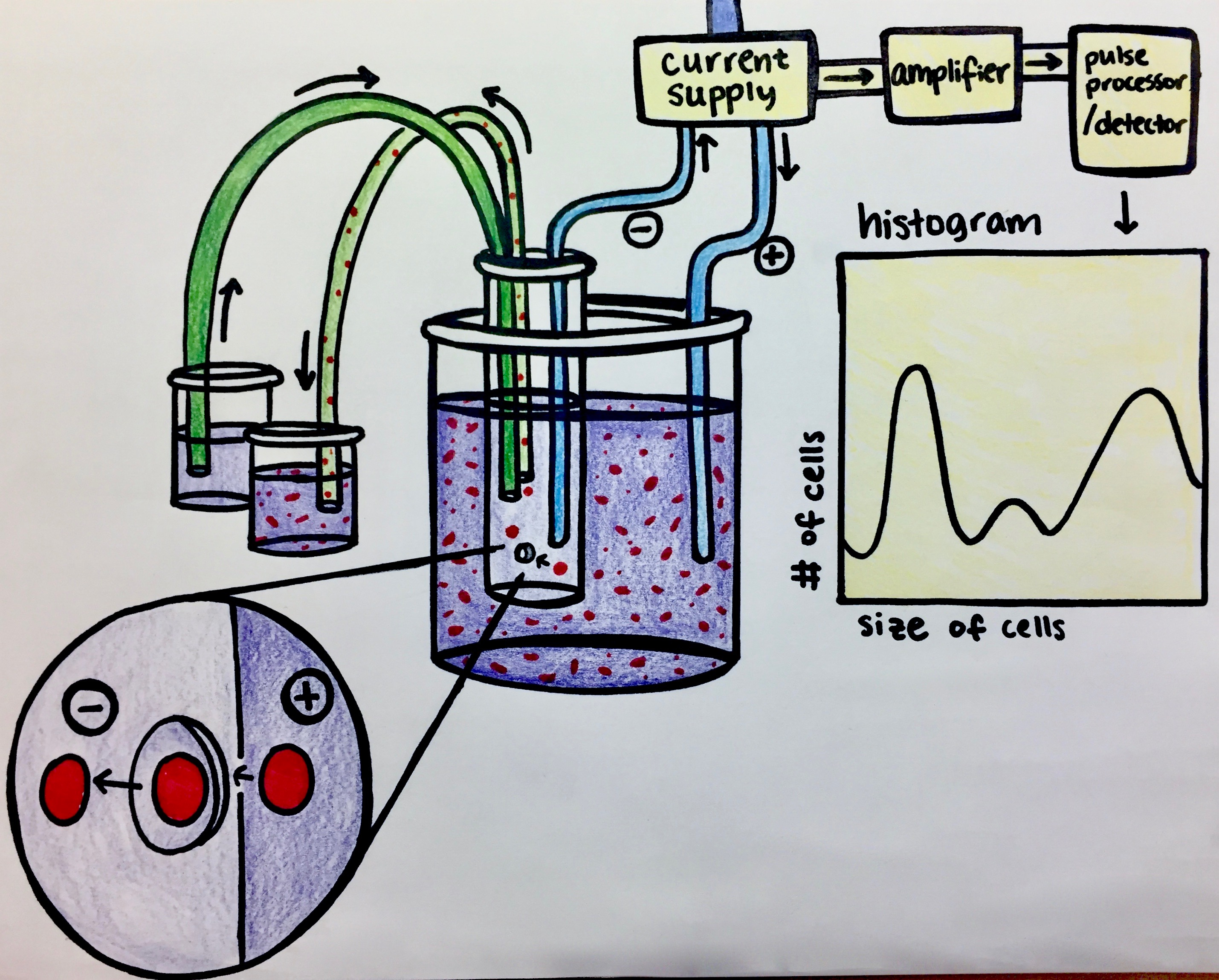
Schematic diagram of 3-part analyzer.

A 3-part differential cell counter uses Coulter's principle to find the size and volume of the cell. The sample is lysed and dissolved into an electrolyte solution in a container, which also holds a smaller container. The smaller container has two pumps running to and from its solution, one creating a vacuum and the other replacing the lost solution. The smaller container has a small hole (an orifice) near the bottom of the container. Coulter's principle is applied through the use of two electrodes. One electrode (the internal electrode) is within the smaller container, and the other (the external electrode) is outside of the smaller container but within the electrolyte/sample solution. As the vacuum draws the sample cells through the orifice, the cell momentarily causes electrical resistance to the current as it passes through the orifice. This resistance is recorded, measured, amplified, and processed which can then be interpreted by the computer into a histogram. The 3-part analyzer is able to differentiate between three types of white blood cells (WBCs): neutrophils, lymphocytes, and monocytes.

=== 5-part differential cell counter ===
This type of hematology analyzer utilizes both Coulter's principle and flow cytometry to determine the granularity, diameter, and inner complexity of the cells. Using hydrodynamic focusing, the cells are sent through an aperture one cell at a time. During this, a laser is directed at them, and the scattered light is measured at multiple angles. The absorbance is also recorded. The cell can be identified based on the intensity of the scattered light and the level of absorbance. A 5-part cell counter can differentiate all WBC types (neutrophils, lymphocytes, basophils, eosinophils, and monocytes). 5-part analyzers are more expensive than 3-part analyzers, but provide more in-depth information about the sample. Specific jobs, such as allergy testing, require 5-part differential analysis. However, most medical tasks can be completed with the 3-part analyzer.

== Components ==
The hematology analyzer is broken down into five key components:

1. Power source
2. Control unit
3. Sample Reagent Tray
4. Collecting system
5. Data storage
6. Processing system

== Producers ==
These are the major companies that are known to make quality Hematology Analyzers for hospitals and laboratories:

1. Beckman Coulter
2. Sysmex Corporation
3. HORIBA Ltd
4. Abbott Laboratories
5. NORMA Instruments
6. Bio-Rad Laboratories
7. Siemens AG
8. Mindray Medical International Limited
9. Boule Diagnostics AB
10. Aima Diagnostics (Norway)
11. Roche Diagnostics
12. Nihon Kohden Corporation
13. Seamaty Technology
