= Time-lapse monitoring =

Time-lapse monitoring may refer to:

- Time-lapse microscopy
- Time-lapse cytometry
