= Cytometry =

Measurement of number and characteristics of cells

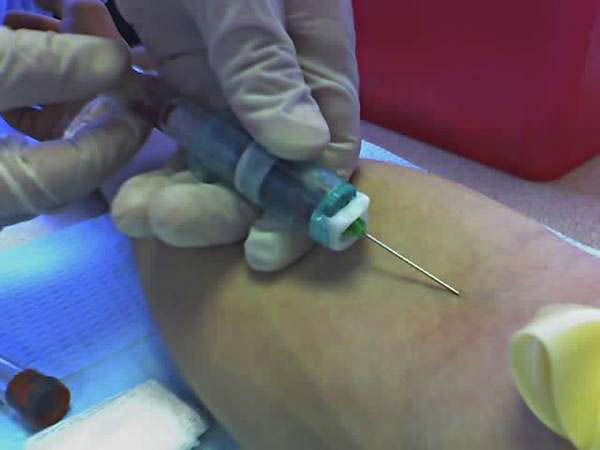
Cytometers are the instruments which count the blood cells in the common blood test.

Cytometry is the measurement of number and characteristics of cells. Variables that can be measured by cytometric methods include cell size, cell count, cell morphology (shape and structure), cell cycle phase, DNA content, and the existence or absence of specific proteins on the cell surface or in the cytoplasm. Cytometry is used to characterize and count blood cells in common blood tests such as the complete blood count. In a similar fashion, cytometry is also used in cell biology research and in medical diagnostics to characterize cells in a wide range of applications associated with diseases such as cancer and AIDS.

== Cytometric devices ==
=== Image cytometers ===
Image cytometry is the oldest form of cytometry. Image cytometers operate by statically imaging a large number of cells using optical microscopy. Prior to analysis, cells are commonly stained to enhance contrast or to detect specific molecules by labeling these with fluorochromes. Traditionally, cells are viewed within a hemocytometer to aid manual counting.

Since the introduction of the digital camera, in the mid-1990s, the automation level of image cytometers has steadily increased. This has led to the commercial availability of automated image cytometers, ranging from simple cell counters to sophisticated high-content screening systems.

=== Flow cytometers ===
Due to the early difficulties of automating microscopy, the flow cytometer has since the mid-1950s been the dominating cytometric device. Flow cytometers operate by aligning single cells using flow techniques. The cells are characterized optically or by the use of an electrical impedance method called the Coulter principle. To detect specific molecules when optically characterized, cells are in most cases stained with the same type of fluorochromes that are used by image cytometers. Flow cytometers generally provide less data than image cytometers, but have a significantly higher throughput.

=== Cell sorters ===
Cell sorters are flow cytometers capable of sorting cells according to their characteristics. The sorting is achieved by using technology similar to what is used in inkjet printers. The fluid stream is broken up into droplets by a mechanical vibration. The droplets are then electrically charged according to the characteristics of the cell contained within the droplet. Depending on their charge, the droplets are finally deflected by an electric field into different containers.

=== Time-lapse cytometers ===
A key characteristic of time-lapse cytometers is their use of non heat-generating light sources such as light-emitting diodes. This allows a time-lapse cytometer to be placed inside a conventional cell culture incubator to facilitate continuous observation of cellular processes without heat building up inside the incubator.

== History ==
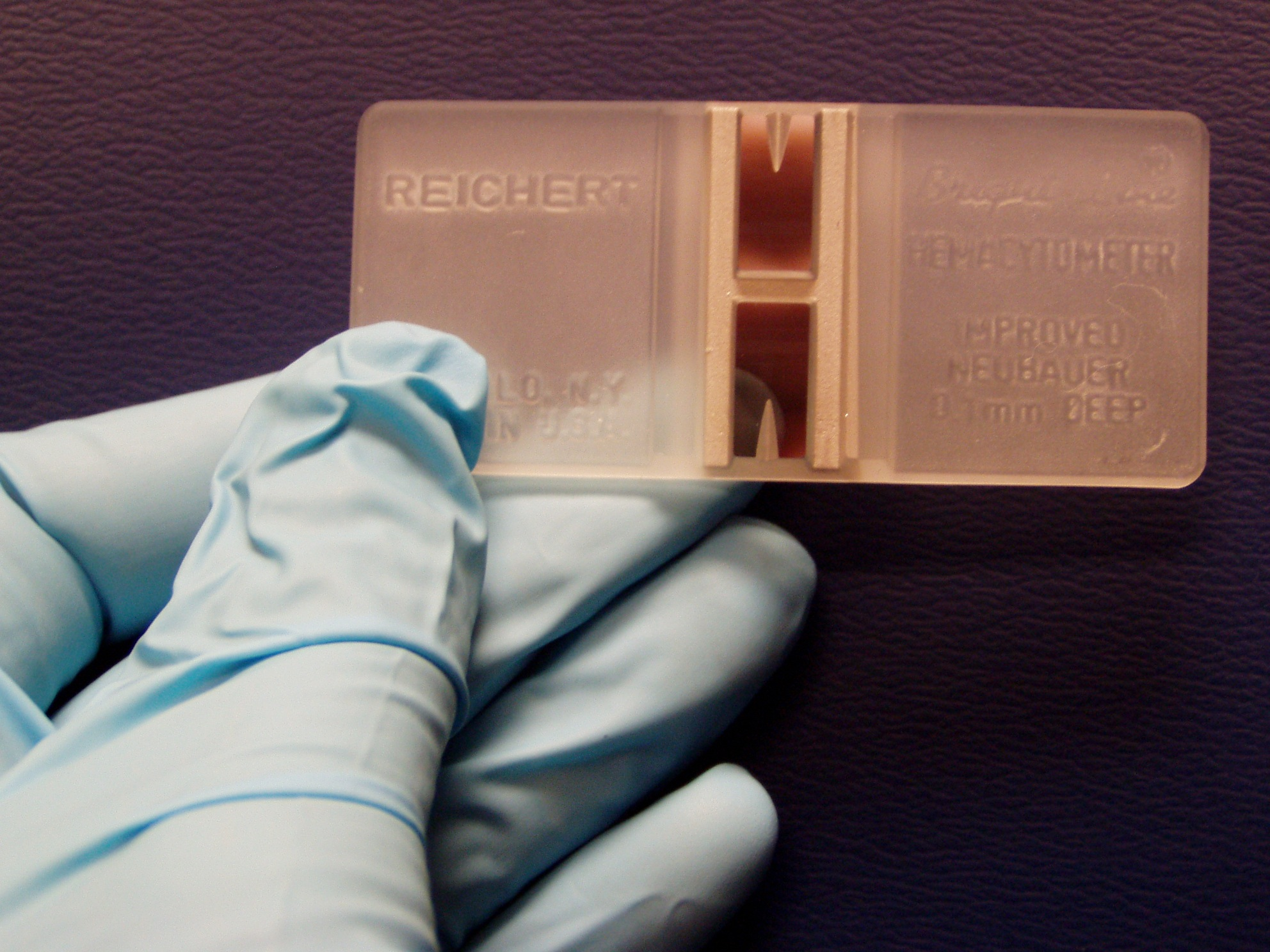
A hemocytometer

=== Hemocytometer ===
The early history of cytometry is closely associated with the development of the blood cell counting. Through the work of Karl von Vierordt, Louis-Charles Malassez, Karl Bürker and others blood cell concentration could by the late 19th century be accurately measured using a blood cell counting chamber, the hemocytometer, and an optical microscope.

Until the 1950s the hemocytometer was the standard method to count blood cells. In blood cell counting applications the hemocytometer has now been replaced by electronic cell counters. However, the hemocytometer is still being used to count cells in cell culture laboratories. Successively the manual task of counting, using a microscope, is taken over by small automated image cytometers.

=== Fluorescence microscope ===
In 1904, Moritz von Rohr and August Köhler at Carl Zeiss in Jena constructed the first ultraviolet microscope. The intent of the microscope was to obtain higher optical resolution by using illumination with a shorter wavelength than visual light. However, they experienced difficulties with autofluorescence when observing biological material. Fortunately, Köhler saw the potential of fluorescence. A filtering technique for fluorescence excitation light was developed by Heinrich Lehmann at Zeiss in 1910, based on work by Robert Wood. However, the "Lumineszenzmikroskop" he developed was only second on the market, after the one independently developed by Oskar Heimstädt who worked at C Reichert, Optische Werke AG in Vienna, which today is a part of Leica Microsystems.

=== Cytophotometry ===
By the early 1930s various firms manufactured ultraviolet fluorescent microscopes. The stage was set for cytometry to now go beyond the now established hemocytometer. At this time, Torbjörn Caspersson, working at the Karolinska Institute in Stockholm, developed a series of progressively more sophisticated instruments called cytophotometers. These instruments combined a fluorescent microscope with a spectrophotometer to quantify cellular nucleic acids and their relation to cell growth and function. Caspersson’s early apparatus now seems hopelessly primitive. But, even this primitive apparatus got results, and attracted the attention of other researchers. Many of the advances in analytical cytology from the 1940s and on-wards were made by people who made the pilgrimage to Stockholm.

=== Pulse cytophotometry ===
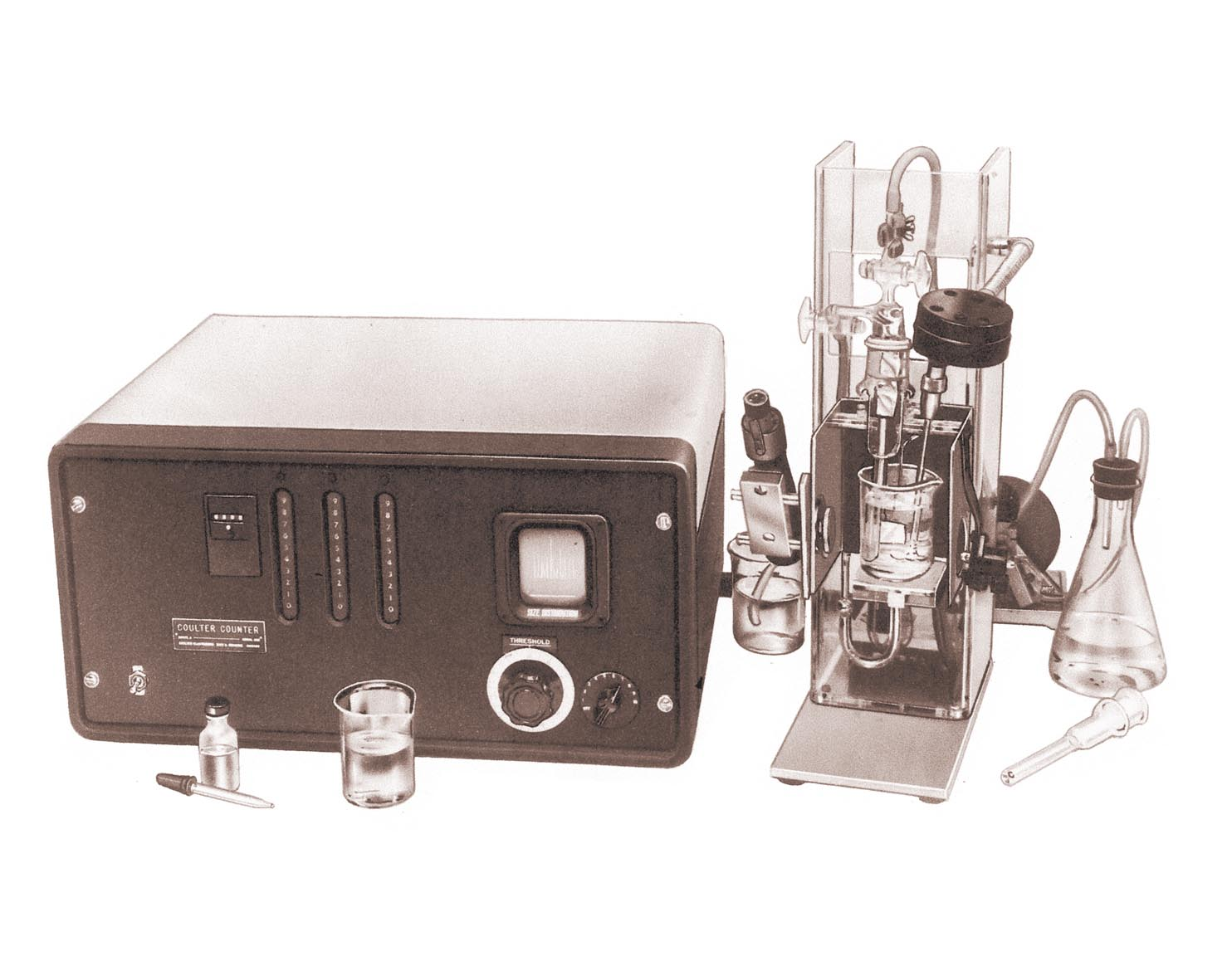
Model A Coulter Counter — The first commercial flow cytometer

The first attempts to automate cell counting were made around World War II. Gucker et al. builds a device to detect bacteria in aerosols. Lagercrantz builds an automated cell counter based on microscopy and identifies the difficulties in aligning cells to be individually counted using microscopy, as Moldavan had proposed in 1934. Joseph and Wallace Coulter circumnavigates these difficulties by inventing the principle of using electrical impedance to count and size microscopic particles suspended in a fluid. This principle is today known as the Coulter principle and was used in the automated blood cell counter released by Coulter Electronics in 1954. The “Coulter counter” was the first commercial flow cytometer.

During the 1960s Dittrich, Göhde and Kamentsky improves the design pioneered by Caspersson 30 years earlier. Dittrich and Göhde’s pulse cytophotometer was built around a Zeiss fluorescent microscope and commercialized as the ICP 11 by Partec GmbH in 1968. Kamentsky’s device was commercialized by Bio/Physics Systems Inc. as the Cytograph in 1970. These devices were able to count cells, like the earlier Coulter counter. But more importantly, they were also capable of measuring cellular characteristics. However, these early cytophotometers where microscopy-based.

=== Flow cytometry ===
In 1953 Crosland-Taylor published an unsuccessful attempt to count red blood cells using microscopy in which he solved the problem of aligning cells by using sheath fluid to hydrodynamically focus the cells. In the late 1960s, Van Dilla at Los Alamos National Laboratory built the first non microscopy-based cytophotometer. He did this by combining Crosland-Taylor's breakthrough with the fluorescent dyes originally developed for microscopy and a laser-based fluorescent detection system — the flow cytometer as we know it today. Fulwyler, at Los Alamos as well, combines the Coulter principle with continuous inkjet printer technology to create the first cell sorter in 1965.

In 1973 Steinkamp and the team at Los Alamos follow up with a fluorescence-based cell sorter.

In 1978, at the Conference of the American Engineering Foundation in Pensacola, Florida, the name pulse cytophotometry was changed to flow cytometry, a term which quickly became popular. At that point pulse cytophotometry had evolved into the modern form of flow cytometry, pioneered by Van Dilla ten years earlier.

== See also ==
- Mass cytometry
