= Wallace H. Coulter Department of Biomedical Engineering =

Coordinates: 33.77849°N 84.39682°W

- Type: Public
- Established: 1997
- Undergraduates: 1,162
- Postgraduates: 377
- Location: Atlanta, Georgia, United States
- Website: www.bme.gatech.edu

The Wallace H. Coulter Department of Biomedical Engineering is a department in the Emory University School of Medicine and Georgia Institute of Technology's College of Engineering dedicated to the study of and research in biomedical engineering, and is named after the pioneering engineer and Georgia Tech alumnus Wallace H. Coulter.

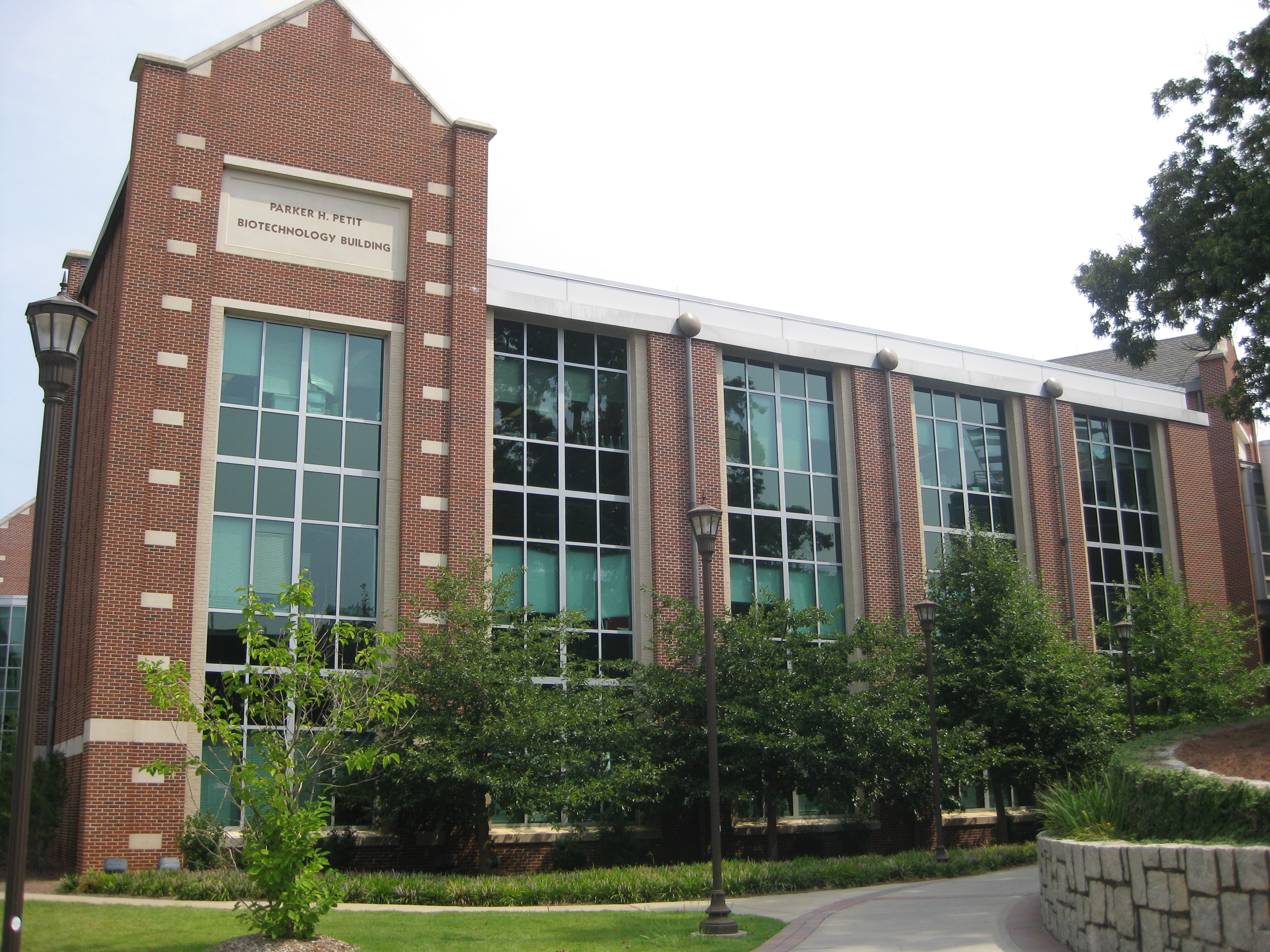
Petit Biotechnology Building

== History ==
=== Establishment ===
Georgia Tech Provost and Vice President Michael E. Thomas and the Emory Dean of Medicine Thomas J. Lawley established an Advisory Committee of Georgia Tech and Emory faculty to address new opportunities in biomedical engineering. The Committee met initially on June 2, 1997 and was charged to develop a set of recommendations for an innovative and unique Department of Biomedical Engineering that is joint with Georgia Tech and Emory and that will enable both institutions to maximize research and educational opportunities in fields of intersecting biomedical interest. The Committee was required to report to Drs. Thomas and Lawley no later than August 15, 1997.

=== Naming ===
Recognized as one of the most influential inventors of the twentieth century, Wallace Coulter studied electronics as a student at Georgia Tech in the early 1930s.

=== Recognition ===
The National Academy of Engineering awarded three professors in this department, Wendy C. Newstetter, Joseph M. Le Doux, and Paul Benkeser, with the 2019 Bernard M. Gordon Prize for Innovation in Engineering and Technology Education. They were recognized for "fusing problem-driven engineering education with learning science principles to create a pioneering program that develops leaders in biomedical engineering.”
