= Celloscope automated cell counter =

Cell counting and analysis device

Celloscope automated cell counter was developed in the 1950s for enumeration of erythrocytes, leukocytes, and thrombocytes in blood samples. Together with the Coulter counter, the Celloscope analyzer can be considered one of the predecessors of today's automated hematology analyzers, as the principle of the electrical impedance method is still utilized in cell counters installed in clinical laboratories around the world.

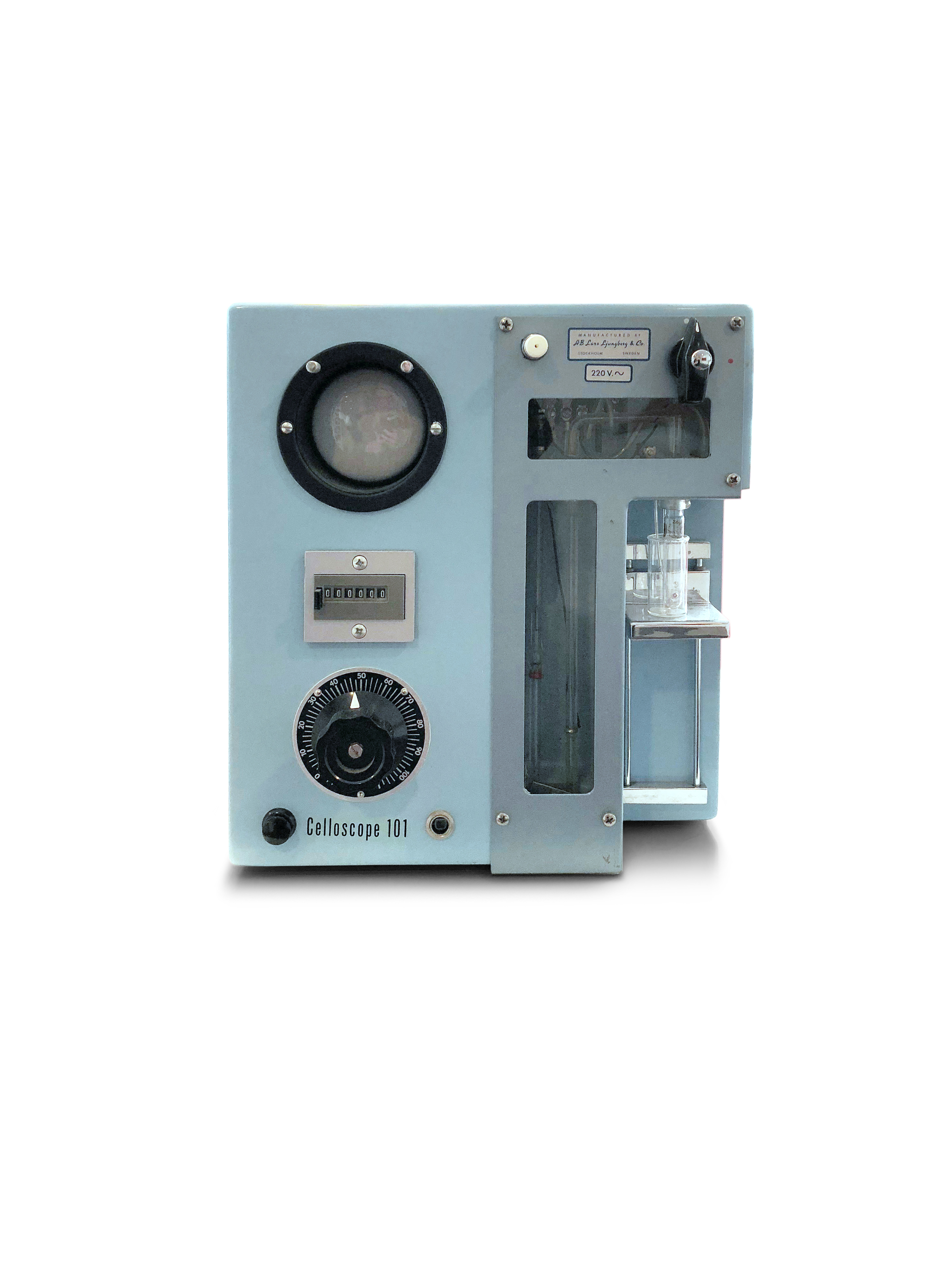
Celloscope 101 counter.

== History ==
The Celloscope was developed for the Swedish company AB Lars Ljungberg & Co under the direction of engineer Erik Öhlin at Linson Instrument AB. In an interview published in the Clinical Biochemistry in the Nordics, a membership magazine for the Nordic Association for Clinical Chemistry, Lars Ljungberg explains that he and his coworkers had been considering different solutions for counting blood cells for some time when they came across a method presented by the American Navy on how particles could be counted when allowed to pass a capillary hole through which a weak direct current was passed simultaneously. The Celloscope method exploits the feature of blood cells not being conductive and therefore making interruptions (pulses) to the current, which then can be counted. What Ljungberg and coworkers did not know was that Wallace H. Coulter in Chicago had applied for and received a patent on the particle count principle in 1953. When presented at a German tradeshow in September 1957, the Celloscope counter was examined by Dr. George Brecher, the first author of one of the NIH evaluations of the Coulter counter. In a letter to Coulter, Brecher reported about what he thought was a close functional copy of the Coulter counter, yet with simpler electronics and an integrated sample stand, creating a both smaller and less costly instrument for use in clinical applications. When the Celloscope was introduced to the market in the early 60s, a lawsuit was filed by Coulter Electronics Inc. against AB Lars Ljungberg & Co for alleged infringement of the American patent. After many and long negotiations, the companies came to the agreement to compensate Coulter for the sales that had been made in USA and some European countries where he had the patent and that AB Lars Ljungberg & Co was free to sell their analyzer in other regions.

== Method principle ==
Before the introduction of the first automated cell counters, hematologists were referred to manual cell count under the microscope. The Celloscope method for automated counting of blood cells was described in an article by Öhlin in 1958. In the described method, cells in a saline (conductive) solution are allowed to pass through a capillary with a length and diameter corresponding to the size of blood cells. At the same time, an electric current passes the capillary, and each cell then gives rise to an electric pulse through the increase in resistance that it causes in the electric circuit. The number of pulses is recorded and corresponds to the number of cells in a certain volume. Diluting the blood sample to a sufficient extent for the distance between the cells when passing through the capillary to be greater than the dimension of the cells and capillary ensures that each cell is counted individually. As cells are counted in an absolute volume of the suspension, the number of cells in mm^{3} of whole blood can be calculated using the dilution factor. The described automated Celloscope cell count method enabled an improved accuracy compared with manual examination by microscopy, while decreasing manual work for the operator. The method allows 50 000 cells to be counted in about 45 seconds, with high accuracy. The Celloscope counter was also equipped with a discriminator, or electrical threshold, which allows only pulses above a certain size to be counted, enabling different blood cells to be counted. For example, set to a threshold of 3 μm, all cells are counted. A re-count at a threshold of 4 μm allows calculation of the number of cells of a size between 3 and 4 μm from the total counts. Diluting the blood sample 1/80 000 in a physiological saline solution allows enumeration of the erythrocytes, as the number of leukocytes does not affect the result more than by about 1/1 000 000. For the leukocyte count, cells in the same sample are hemolyzed with saponin or cetrimide so that only the nuclei of the leukocytes are counted. For platelet count, a smaller capillary diameter is used. To identify cell morphologies and variants that the counter cannot detect, microscopy remains an essential complement to the automated cell count method.

== Successor cell counters ==
The impedance method used in the Celloscope analyzer has been further developed to allow counting also of leukocyte subgroups. In addition to the cell counts, modern hematology analyzers are also capable of reporting parameters related to cell size, hemoglobin concentration, as well as a range of calculated parameters, for a complete blood count (CBC). These analyzers were initially intended to be used in hospital laboratories, as they required a skilled staff and a high sample load to justify their relatively high cost, however, with the increasing need for decentralized healthcare, the demand for simpler analyzers emerged and prompted the development of benchtop cell counters that could be used in a near-patient clinical setting with a minimum of training. In 1969, Erik Öhlin founded Swelab Instrument AB (today, Boule Medical AB), and later, the Swelab AutoCounter AC-series was launched to meet the needs of the smaller clinical laboratories.

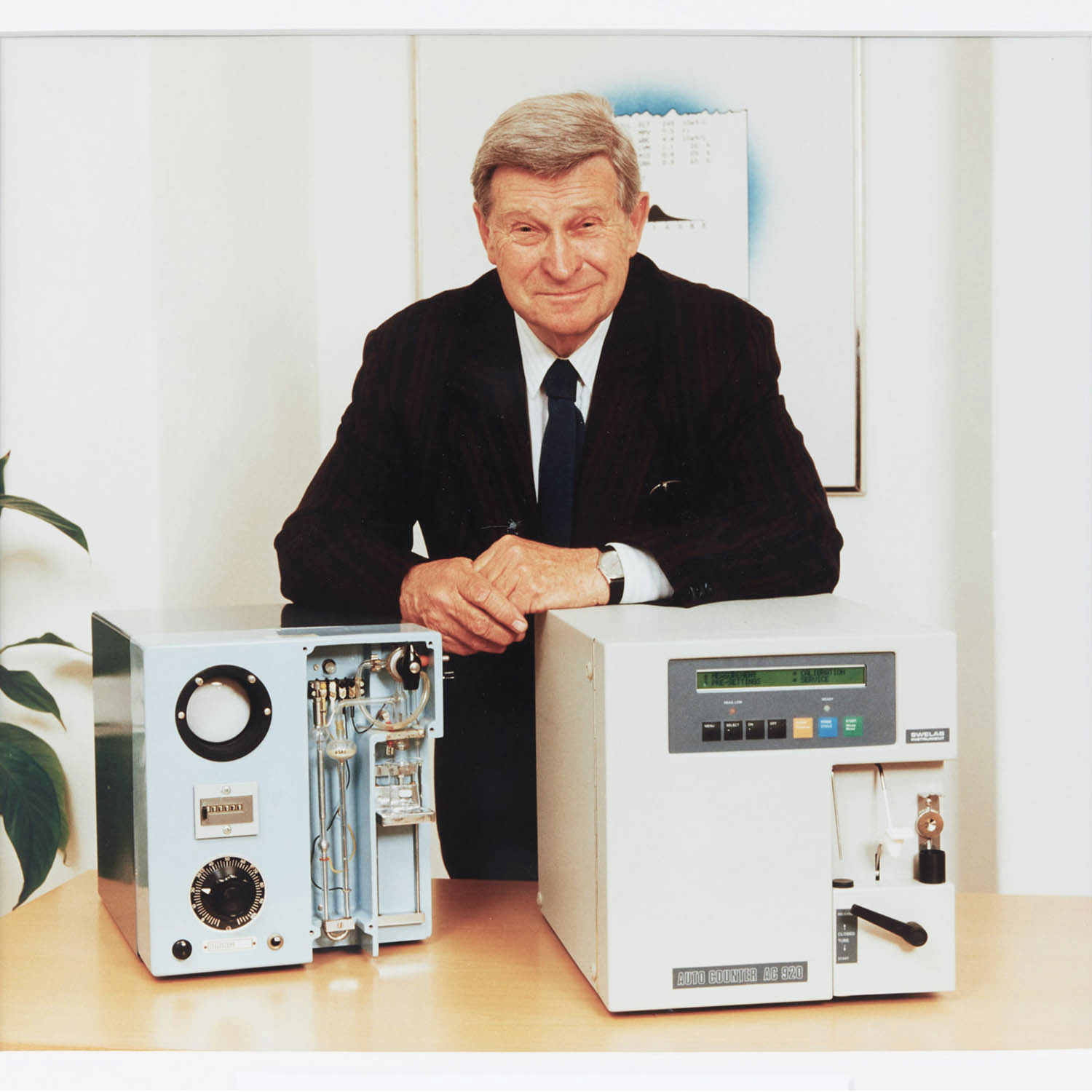
Erik Öhlin, with the Celloscope counter (left) and Swelab AutoCounter (right).

The cell counters of that time used LED screens for result review. In 1982, Medonic AB, another Swedish company with focus on hematology, was founded. The founders, Ingemar Berndtsson and Abraham Bottema, both had a long history and experience in hematology, clinical chemistry, and blood banking engineering. In 1985, Medonic AB launched the Cellanalyzer CA 480 system, its first own-developed cell counter with a built-in display that also showed the cell histograms. When computers began to be incorporated into the analyzers, other brands, like the Swelab analyzers, also came with a display. Both targeting the smaller clinical laboratories, Swelab Instrument AB and Medonic AB were competitors on the decentralized hematology testing market. In the late 90s, both Swelab Instrument AB and Medonic AB were acquired by Boule Diagnostics AB. The company has kept the parallel brands and the analyzers are still manufactured from its facilities in Stockholm, Sweden and supplied under the Swelab and Medonic trademarks for the decentralized hematology testing market.

When Coulter was acquired by Beckman, former Coulter employees Dr. Harold R Crews, Andrew C Swanson, and Donald Grantham founded Clinical Diagnostic Solutions, Inc. (CDS) in 1997, focusing on the development and production of generic reagents and control material. In 2004, CDS was acquired by Boule. By this acquisition, Boule came to master the skills of the development and production of both instruments and the consumables included in a complete hematology system.

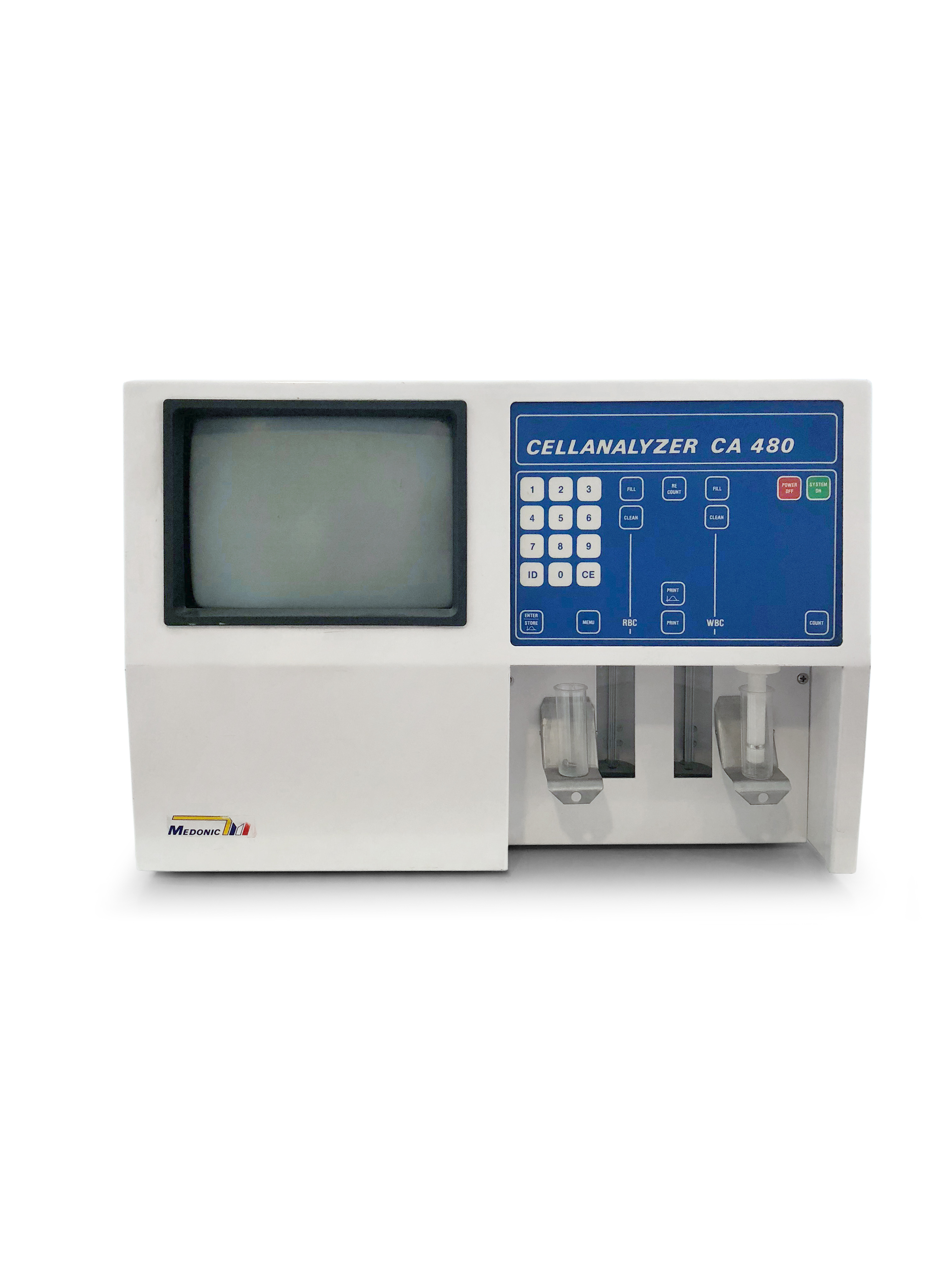
Medonic Cellanalyzer CA 480.

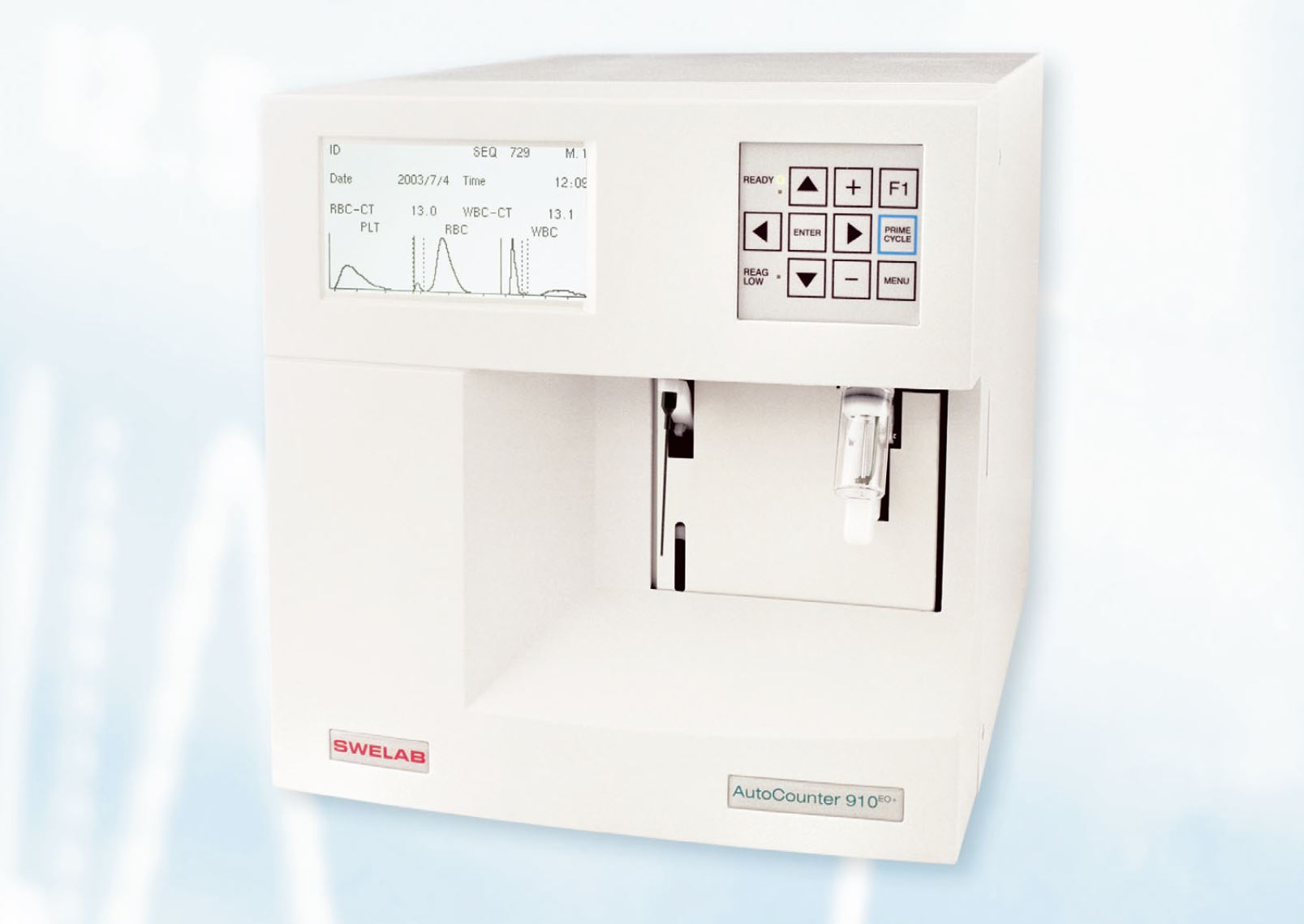
Swelab AutoCounter 910.
