= Izon Science =

Izon Science Limited
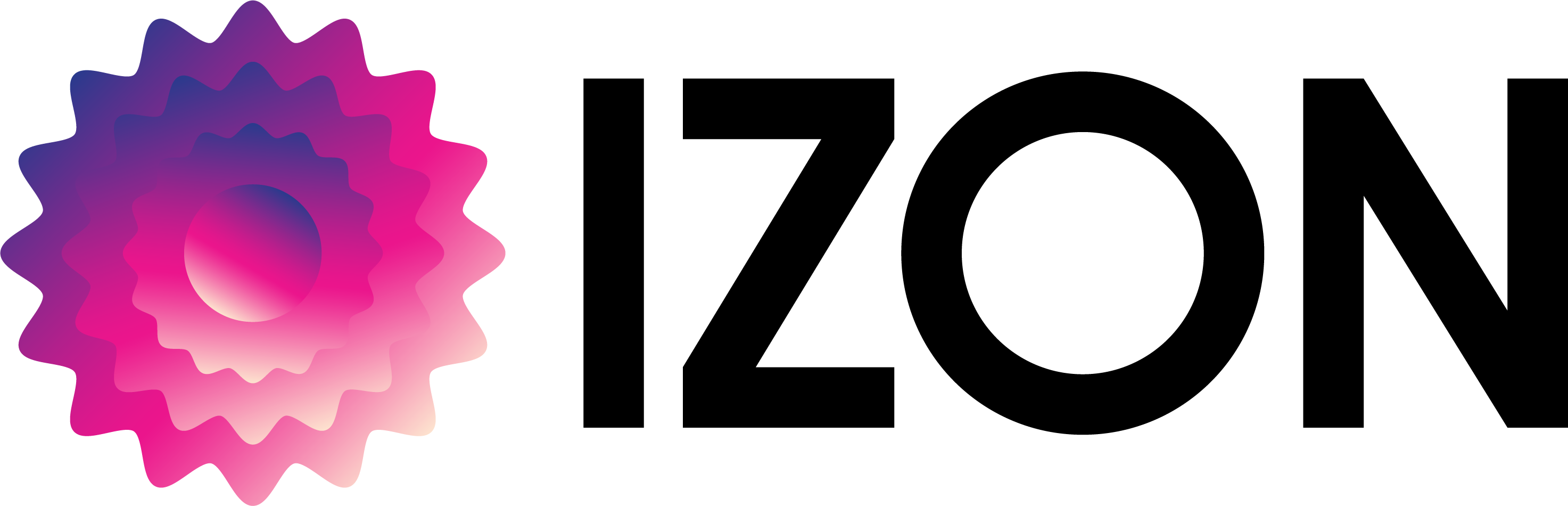
- Type: Private Limited Company
- Industry: Nanotechnology
- Founded: Christchurch, New Zealand, 2005; 16 years ago
- Founder: Hans van der Voorn
- Headquarters: Christchurch, New Zealand
- Area served: Worldwide
- Key people: Hans van der Voorn, CEO
- Products: Automatic Fraction Collector, qEV columns, the Exoid
- Website: izon.com

Izon Science Limited is a nanotechnology company that develops and sells nano-scale particle analysis and isolation tools. Their main instruments are based on principles of size exclusion chromatography and tunable resistive pulse sensing. Izon’s size-exclusion chromatography columns and related solutions are also used by diagnostics companies focused on developing extracellular vesicle biomarkers.

Izon Science’s headquarters is located in Addington (Christchurch, New Zealand), where all instruments are manufactured.

== Background/History ==
Izon Science Limited is a company incorporated as Australo Ltd. on January 10, 2005, by four New Zealand-based scientists. In 2007, Hans van der Voorn became CEO, and on November 17, 2008, the company was renamed Izon Science Limited. Initially focused on developing tunable resistive pulse sensing instruments for nanoparticle characterization, the company later expanded into developing tools for isolating exosomes and other extracellular vesicles from biological fluids. Presently, Izon Science develops and manufactures tools for nanoparticle characterization and separation, catering to academic researchers and diagnostics companies working with extracellular vesicles, as well as those involved in nanomedicine, viruses, and virus-like particles.

The Exoid is one of Izon's latest tunable resistive pulse sensing instruments, succeeding the qViro-X, qMicro, and qNano. In June 2021, Izon Science relocated its headquarters from Burnside (Christchurch) to a larger facility on Show Place, Addington (Christchurch). The company currently employs approximately 70 individuals.

Izon has received investment funds from Bolton Equities, a privately funded investor group based in New Zealand. Research partnerships include the University Medical Center Utrecht and the VU University Medical Center in the Netherlands, the Mayo Clinic, the National Institutes of Health, and Massachusetts General Hospital.

== Key scientific principles ==
=== Size exclusion chromatography ===
Izon Science produces a range of size-exclusion chromatography (SEC) columns called ‘qEV columns’ that separate extracellular vesicles from other constituents in a wide range of biological sample types. qEV columns are packed with a porous, polyacrylamide resin, which facilitates the separation of bio-molecules and particles in a solution based on size. Once a sample is loaded onto the column, the sample passes through the resin under the force of gravity. Larger particles elute the earliest, as they cannot enter the pores in the resin and therefore take a more direct route down the column. In contrast, particles smaller than the designated cutoff size (35 nm or 70 nm, depending on the qEV column) enter pores in the resin and elute later. The sample exits the bottom of the column and is collected into collection tubes placed in the Automatic Fraction Collector, or through manual collection.

=== Tunable resistive pulse sensing ===
Tunable resistive pulse sensing (TRPS) is a single-particle analytical technique used to measure the size, concentration, and charge of nano and micro-sized particles by detecting a change in ionic current. The passage of an individual particle through a charged nanopore creates a transient change in resistance and subsequent decrease in the background current, known as a blockade event. Blockade characteristics are representative of particle and sample properties: blockade magnitude is proportional to particle size, the blockade rate is directly related to particle concentration, and the speed with which a particle moves through the pore is related to its zeta potential.

== Products ==
=== qEV columns ===
Size exclusion chromatography-based qEV columns contain porous polysaccharide resins, which enable extracellular vesicles to be isolated in preparation for a range of downstream analytical methods. The range of qEV columns facilitate the separation of particles in the ranges of 35-350 and 70-1000 nm and accommodate sample loading volumes between ≤150 μL and 100 mL. The manual and time-consuming work previously associated with SEC is reduced by the qEV Automatic Fraction Collector (AFC). The AFC utilizes a rotational carousel for holding collection tubes and has an in-built computer that can be programmed to automate the void volume and purified collection volume. During sample collection, the carousel detects the weight of each purified collection volume and automatically advances to the next collection tube.

=== Automatic Fraction Collector ===
The Automatic Fraction Collector (AFC) is a programmable, automation technology designed to enhance the reproducibility and scalability of sample collection from qEV columns. The AFC manages the collection of fractions from the qEV column by differentiating between the buffer volume, and the volume of fractions containing extracellular vesicles. It has an in-built rotational carousel for holding collection tubes, and precisely measures the volume of each fraction by weight as the sample elutes from the column. Together, qEV columns and the AFC are known as the qEV isolation platform. Multiple AFCs can be used in parallel to increase the throughput of extracellular vesicle isolation.

=== Tunable resistive pulse sensing instruments ===
The Exoid is the most recent tunable resistive pulse sensing instrument developed by Izon Science and incorporates automated systems to avoid the extensive manual tuning associated with the qNano. Previously, with the qNano, there were many manual components: nanopore stretch had to be adjusted manually using a handle, and pressure was adjusted manually via a variable pressure module (VPM). In contrast, the Exoid automatically adjusts stretch, voltage and pressure, after parameters are selected using the software. The Exoid is capable of measuring the size, concentration, and zeta potential of individual particles sized between approximately 40 nm and 10 μm. The qNano is the original TRPS instrument by Izon Science, and remained the main TRPS instrument from its release in June 2009 until it was replaced by the Exoid in March 2021. Unlike the qNano, the Exoid has built-in semi-automated components for controlling pressure and nanopore stretch, and an enhanced voltage clamp amplifier. The qNano required manual tuning to adjust the stretch of the nanopore and the electrokinetic pressure, while voltage was selected via the software program. Nanopore stretch was adjusted using a handle, while pressure was adjusted by using a variable pressure module to manage a tube and plunger system. There were several updates to the qNano following its release including the addition of a pressure readout module.

=== Other ===
Izon Science supplies individual and complementary parts for qEV isolation and TRPS measurements, including nanopores, TRPS calibration particles, TRPS fluid cells and qEV racks for storing qEV columns. The qEV RNA Extraction kit, manufactured for Izon Science by Norgen Biotek, is supplied to facilitate the extraction of RNA from EVs. The qEV Concentration Kit utilises Ceres NanoSciences Nanotrap® Extracellular Vesicle Particles to enable the concentration of extracellular vesicles isolated using qEV columns. The qEV RNA Extraction Kit can be used with the qEV Concentration Kit, or separately if required.

== Applications & Research Fields ==
Izon’s size-exclusion chromatography qEV isolation platform and tunable resistive pulse sensing instruments are used in the field of extracellular vesicle research and in the development of extracellular vesicle-related biomarkers and diagnostic tests, as well as in the study of antibody preparations, vaccines, lipid nanoparticles, and virus-like particles.
