= Tunable resistive pulse sensing =

Tunable resistive pulse sensing (TRPS) is a single-particle technique used to measure the size, concentration and zeta potential of particles as they pass through a size-tunable nanopore.

The technique adapts the principle of resistive pulse sensing, which monitors current flow through an aperture, combined with the use of tunable nanopore technology, allowing the passage of ionic current and particles to be regulated by adjusting the pore size. The addition of the tunable nanopore allows for the measurement of a wider range of particle sizes and improves accuracy.

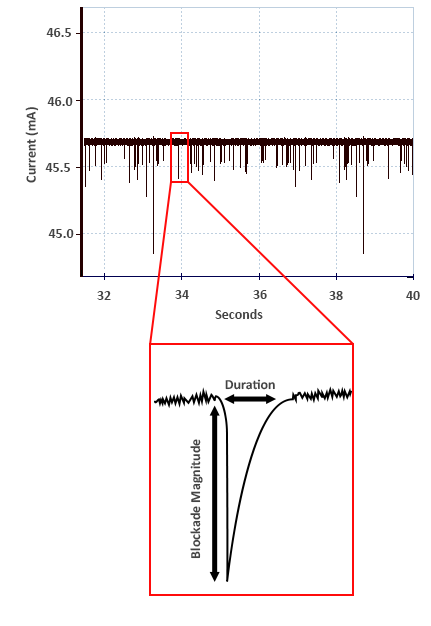
Tunable resistive pulse sensing (TRPS). Particles crossing a pore are detected as a transient change in the ionic current flow, which is denoted as a blockade event with its amplitude denoted as the blockade magnitude.

== Technique ==
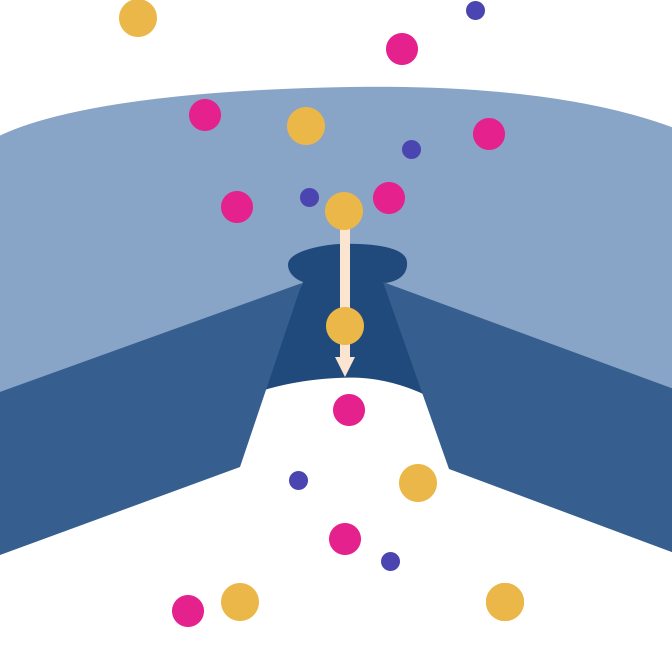
A polydisperse particle sample passing through the tunable nanopore. The size of the aperture is altered by increasing or decreasing the stretch placed upon the nanopore.

Particles crossing a nanopore are detected one at a time as a transient change in the ionic current flow, which is denoted as a blockade event with its amplitude denoted as the blockade magnitude. As blockade magnitude is proportional to particle size, accurate particle sizing can be achieved after calibration with a known standard. This standard is composed of particles of a known size and concentration. For TRPS, carboxylated polystyrene particles are often used.

Nanopore-based detection allows particle-by-particle assessment of complex mixtures. By selecting an appropriately sized nanopore and adjusting its stretch, the nanopore size can be optimized for particle size and improve measurement accuracy.

Adjustments to nanopore stretch, in combination with a fine-control of pressure and voltage allow TRPS to determine sample concentration and to accurately derive individual particle zeta potential in addition to particle size information.

== Applications ==
TRPS was developed by Izon Science Limited, producer of commercially available nanopore-based particle characterization systems. Izon Science Limited currently sell one TRPS device, known as the "Exoid". Previous devices include the "qNano", the "qNano Gold" and the "qViron". These systems have been applied to measure a wide range of biological and synthetic particle types including viruses and nanoparticles. TRPS has been applied in both academic and industrial research fields, including:

- Drug delivery research (e.g. lipid nanoparticles and liposomes)
- Extracellular vesicles such as exosomes
- Virology and vaccine production
- Biomedical diagnostics
- Microfluidics
