= Hydrodynamic focusing =

Method of increasing accuracy when determining cell size

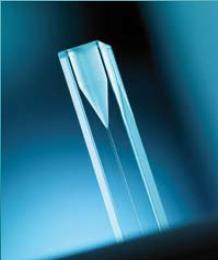
A large cone is used for hydrodynamic focusing and acceleration of the flow (sheath-fluid with the sample). Polished chamfers are used to measure the area, reducing stray light.

In microbiology, hydrodynamic focusing is a technique used to provide more accurate results when using flow cytometers or Coulter counters for determining the size of bacteria or cells.

== Technique ==
=== Measuring particles ===
Cells are counted as they are forced to pass through a small channel (often referred to as a flow cell), causing disruptions in a laser light beam or electricity flow. These disruptions are analyzed by the instruments. It is difficult to create tunnels narrow enough for this purpose using ordinary manufacturing processes, as the diameter must be in the magnitude of micrometers, and the length of the tunnel should exceed several millimeters. The standard channel size used in most production flow cytometers is 250 by 250 micrometers.

=== Focusing with a fluid ===
Hydrodynamic focusing solves this problem by building up the walls of the tunnel from fluid, using the effects of fluid dynamics. A wide (hundreds of micrometers in diameter) tube made of glass or plastic is used, through which a "wall" of fluid called the sheath flow is pumped. The sample is injected into the middle of the sheath flow. If the two fluids differ enough in their velocity or density, they do not mix: they form a two-layer stable flow. Hydrodynamic focusing has also been demonstrated in microgravity environments, where sheath flow stability is maintained under zero-g conditions.

== Sources ==
- Shuler, M. L.; Aris, R; Tsuchiya, H. M. (1972). "Hydrodynamic Focusing and Electronic Cell-Sizing Techniques". Applied Microbiology. 24 (3): 384–388. doi:10.1128/AEM.24.3.384-388.1972. PMC 376528. PMID 16349933.
