= Michael E. Thomas =

American university administrator and professor (1937–2018)

- Born: May 10, 1937; Monahans, Texas
- Died: November 23, 2018 (aged 81); Greensboro, Georgia
- Education: University of Texas at Austin; Johns Hopkins University
- Awards: INFORMS Fellow; IIE Fellow; George E. Kimball Medal
- Scientific career
- Fields: Industrial engineering
- Workplaces: University of Florida; Georgia Institute of Technology

Michael Edward Thomas (May 10, 1937 - November 23, 2018) was a university administrator and professor of industrial engineering, and was the acting president of the Georgia Institute of Technology in 1994. Thomas was instrumental in the restructuring of Georgia Tech's colleges during the administration of John Patrick Crecine. Thomas was also instrumental in the creation of the Wallace H. Coulter Department of Biomedical Engineering.

Thomas also served as president of INFORMS and was elected a fellow of INFORMS and the Institute of Industrial Engineers. He was named an honorary alumnus of Georgia Tech in 2000. He received INFORMS' 1995 George E. Kimball Medal.

== See also ==
- History of Georgia Tech § Restructuring controversy
- Biography of Michael E. Thomas from the Institute for Operations Research and the Management Sciences
