= Coulter counter =

Device to count and size particles

Coulter principle — the transient current drop is proportional to the particle volume

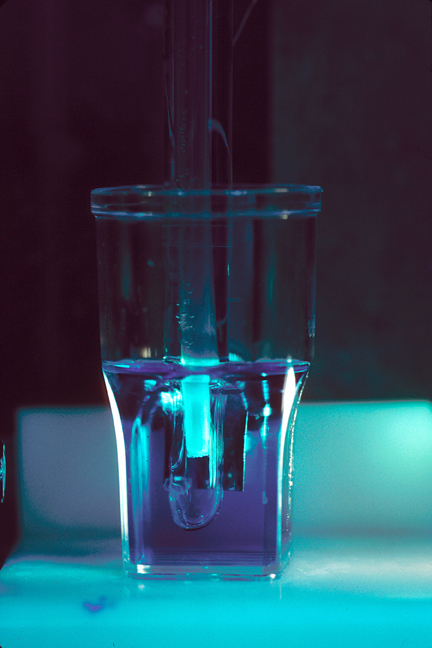
The tip of the Coulter counter in a buffer solution, counting cells in solution.

A Coulter counter is an apparatus for counting and sizing particles suspended in electrolytes. The Coulter counter is the commercial term for the technique known as resistive pulse sensing or electrical zone sensing. The apparatus is based on the Coulter principle named after its inventor, Wallace H. Coulter.

A typical Coulter counter has one or more microchannels that separate two chambers containing electrolyte solutions. As fluid that contains particles or cells is drawn through the microchannels, each particle causes a brief change to the electrical resistance of the liquid. The counter detects these changes in the electrical resistance.

== Coulter principle ==
The Coulter principle states that particles pulled through an orifice, concurrent with an electric current, produce a change in impedance proportional to the volume of the particle traversing the orifice. This pulse in impedance originates from the displacement of electrolyte caused by the particle.

The Coulter principle relies on the fact that particles moving in an electric field cause measurable disturbances in that field. The magnitudes of these disturbances are proportional to the size of the particles in the field. Coulter identified several requirements necessary for practical application of this phenomenon:

- The particles must be suspended in a conducting liquid.
- The electrical field must be physically constricted so that the movement of particles in the field causes detectable changes in the current.
- The particles must be dilute enough so that only one at a time passes through the physical constriction.

If multiple particles pass through the constriction simultaneously, their impedance profiles will overlap, resulting in an artifact known as coincidence. The apparatus cannot differentiate between one large particle and multiple small overlapping particles, causing anomalies in the resulting data.

A variety of experimental devices have been designed based on the Coulter principle. A few of these devices have been commercialized, with the most well-known applications being in the medical industry, particularly in hematology to count and size the various cells that comprise whole blood. All implementations of the Coulter principle have compromises between sensitivity, noise shielding, solvent compatibility, speed of measurement, sample volume, dynamic range, and reliability of device manufacture.

== Development ==
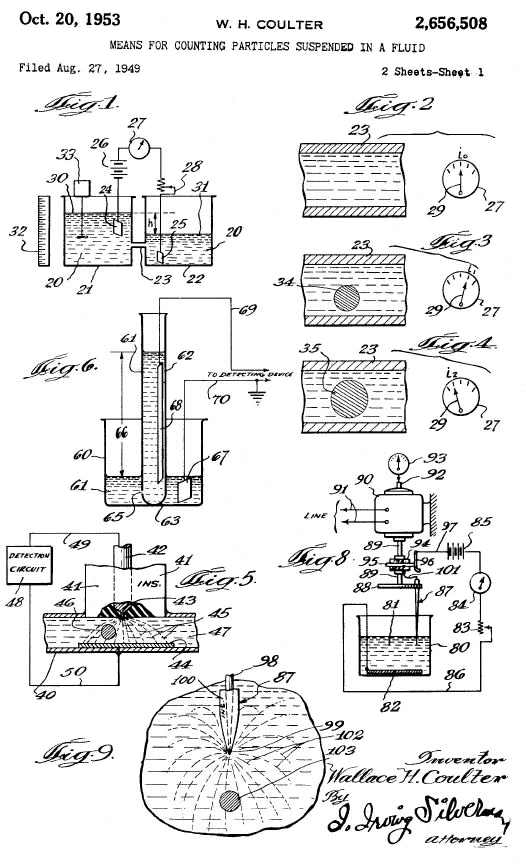
Coulter patented several different implementations of the Coulter principle. Image taken from US Patent No. 2,656,508.

Wallace H. Coulter discovered the Coulter principle in the late 1940s, though a patent was not awarded until October 20, 1953. Coulter was influenced by the atomic bombs dropped on Hiroshima and Nagasaki, which motivated him to improve and streamline complete blood counting for use in large scale screening, as would be necessary in the event of a nuclear war. Partial funding of the project came from a grant award from the Office of Naval Research.

Coulter was awarded US Patent No. 2,656,508, Means for Counting Particles Suspended in a Fluid. This Coulter counter is an analytical instrument which employs the Coulter principle for a specific task, most commonly counting cells. The most commercially successful application of the Coulter principle is in hematology, where it is used to obtain information about patients' blood cells. Coulter counters can also be used in the processing and manufacturing of paint, ceramics, glass, metals, and food. They are also routinely employed for quality control.

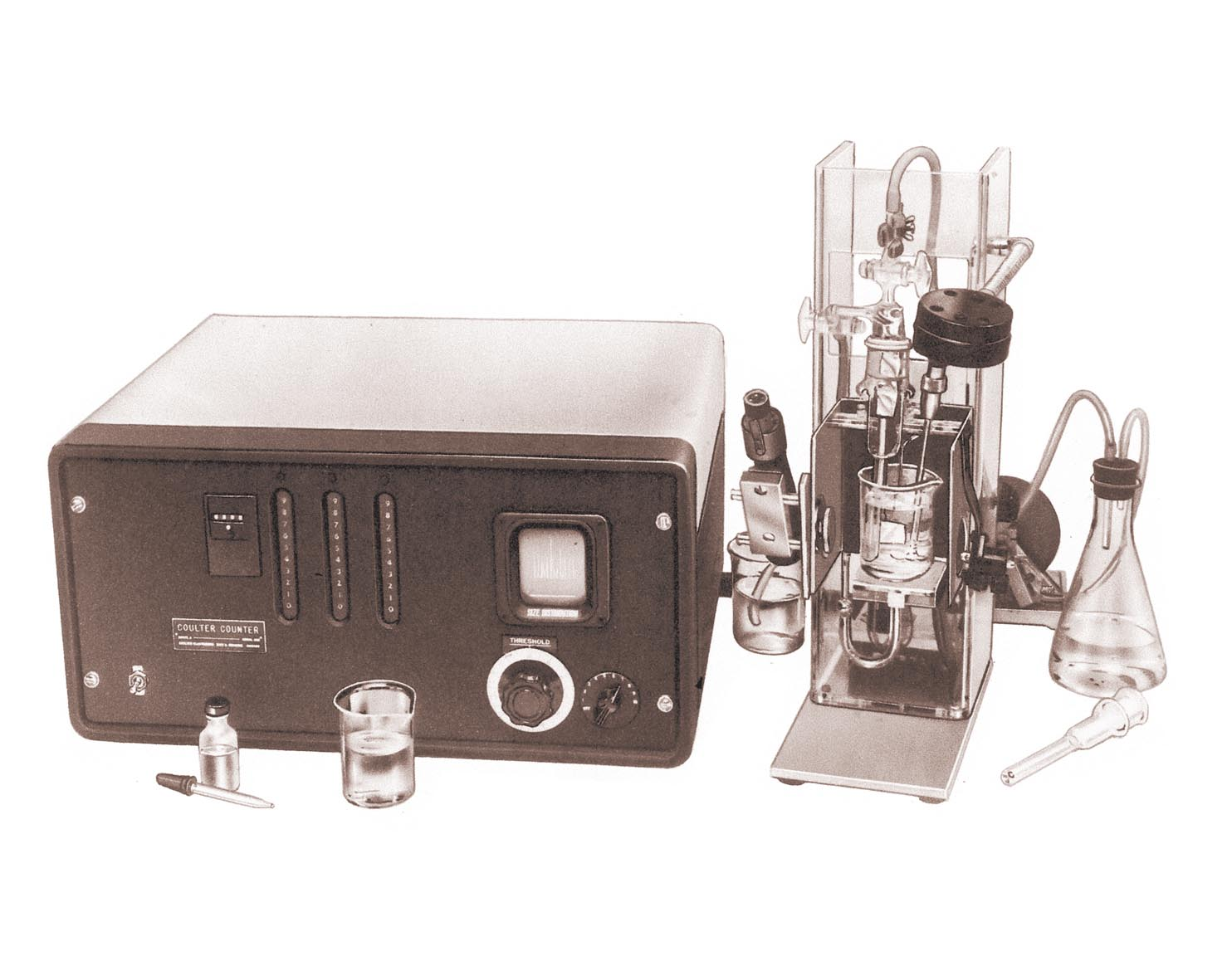
The first commercial Coulter counter

Cells, being poorly conductive particles, alter the effective cross-section of the conductive microchannel. If these particles are less conductive than the surrounding liquid medium, the electrical resistance across the channel increases, causing the electric current passing across the channel to briefly decrease. By monitoring such pulses in electric current, the number of particles for a given volume of fluid can be counted. The size of the electric current change is related to the size of the particle, enabling a particle size distribution to be measured, which can be correlated to mobility, surface charge, and concentration of the particles.

The amount and quality of data obtained varies greatly as a function of the signal processing circuitry in the Coulter counter. Amplifiers with lower noise thresholds and greater dynamic range can increase the sensitivity of the system, and digital pulse height analyzers with variable bin widths provide much higher resolution data as compared to analog analyzers with fixed bins. Combining a Coulter counter with a digital computer allows capture and analysis of many electrical pulse characteristics, while analog counters typically store a limited amount of information about each pulse.

As electric current detectors became more sensitive and less expensive, the Coulter counter became a common hospital laboratory instrument for quick and accurate analysis of complete blood counts (CBC). The CBC is used to determine the number or proportion of white and red blood cells in the body. Previously, this procedure involved preparing a peripheral blood smear and manually counting each type of cell under a microscope, a process that typically required a half-hour.

A Coulter counter played an important role in the development of the first cell sorter, and was involved in the early development of flow cytometry. Some flow cytometers continue to utilize the Coulter principle to provide information about cell size and count.

=== Formats ===
While a Coulter counter can be designed in a variety of ways, there are two chief configurations that have become the most commercially relevant: an aperture format and a flow cell format.

The aperture format is the most-used configuration in commercial Coulter counters, and is suited to testing samples for quality control. In this setup, a small aperture (hole) of specific size is created in a material such as a jewel disk (made of the same material as jewel bearings in watches). This disk is then embedded in the wall of a glass tube, which is then referred to as an aperture tube. The aperture tube is placed in a conducting liquid such that the aperture is completely submerged, and a pump at the top of the tube draws liquid through the aperture. Electrical current is passed through electrodes on either side of the aperture tube; because glass is an electrical insulator, all of this current flows through the aperture. After recording baseline data, the sample to be analyzed is slowly added to the conducting liquid and drawn through the aperture. Variations in conductivity, caused as sample particles pass through the aperture, are recorded as electrical pulses and analyzed to determine the characteristics of the particles and the sample as a whole.

The flow cell format is most commonly implemented in hematology instruments, and some flow cytometers. In this format, electrodes are embedded at either end of a flow channel and the electric field is applied across the channel. This arrangement allows for continuous sample analysis and can be combined with other instrumentation (when equipped with a sheath flow to keep particles centered in middle of the flow channel). This can permit additional measurements to be performed simultaneously, such as probing the particle with a laser. The major disadvantages of the flow cell format are that it is much more expensive to manufacture and is typically fixed to a single channel width, whereas the aperture format offers a wide variety of aperture sizes.

Microfluidic approaches have been used to apply the Coulter principle to lab-on-a-chip particle detection. These techniques allow much smaller pores (holes) to be fabricated than can easily be achieved using in the aperture format. These approaches, known by the generic phrase microfluidic resistive pulse sensing, have allowed the extension of the Coulter principle to the deep sub-micron range, allowing, for example, the direct detection of virus particles in fluid.

== Experimental considerations ==
There are a number of common considerations in creating a test methodology with Coulter counters.

=== Coincidence ===
Anomalous electrical pulses can be generated if multiple particles enter the aperture simultaneously. This situation is known as coincidence. This occurs because there is no way to ensure that a single large pulse is the result of a single large particle or multiple small particles entering the aperture at once. To prevent this situation, samples must be fairly dilute.

=== Particle path ===
The shape of the generated electrical pulse varies with the particle's path through the aperture. Signal artifacts can occur if the electric field density varies across the diameter of the aperture. This variance is a result of both the physical constriction of the electric field and also the fact that the liquid velocity varies as a function of radial location in the aperture. In the flow cell format, this effect is minimized since sheath flow ensures each particle travels an almost identical path through the flow cell. In the aperture format, signal processing algorithms can be used to correct for artifacts resulting from particle path.

=== Conductive particles ===
Conductive particles are a common concern but rarely affect the results of an experiment. This is because the conductivity difference between most conductive materials and ions in liquid (referred to as the discharge potential) is so great that most conductive materials act as insulators in a Coulter counter. The voltage necessary to break down this potential barrier is referred to as the breakdown voltage. For those highly conductive materials that present a problem, the voltage used during a Coulter experiment can be reduced below the breakdown potential (which can be determined empirically).

=== Porous particles ===
The Coulter principle measures the volume of an object, since the disturbance in the electric field is proportional to the volume of electrolyte displaced from the aperture. This leads to some confusion amongst those who are used to optical measurements from microscopes or other systems that only view two dimensions and also show the boundaries of an object. The Coulter principle, on the other hand, measures three dimensions and the volume displaced by an object.

=== Direct current and alternating current ===
The Coulter counter as invented by Wallace Coulter applies a direct current (DC) in order to count particles (cells), and produces electrical pulses of amplitude dependent on the size of cells. The cells can be modelled as electrical insulators surrounded by a conductive liquid which block a portion of the electrical path thus increasing the measured resistance momentarily. This is the most common measuring system using the Coulter principle.

Subsequent developments were able to extend the information obtained by using alternating current (AC) in order to probe the complex electrical impedance of the cells rather their simply counting their number. The cell may then be approximately modelled as an insulating cell membrane surrounding the cell's cytoplasm, which is conductive. The thinness of the cell membrane creates an electrical capacitance between the cytoplasm and the electrolyte surrounding the cell. The electrical impedance may then be measured at different AC frequencies. At low frequencies (well below 1 MHz) the impedance is similar to the DC resistance. However, higher frequencies in the MHz range can be used to probe the thickness of the cell membrane (which determines its capacitance). At much higher frequencies (well above 10 MHz) the impedance of the membrane capacitance drops to the point where the larger contribution to the measured impedance is from the cytoplasm itself (the membrane is essentially "shorted out"). Thus, by using different frequencies, the apparatus can become sensitive to the internal structure and composition of the cells.

== Applications ==
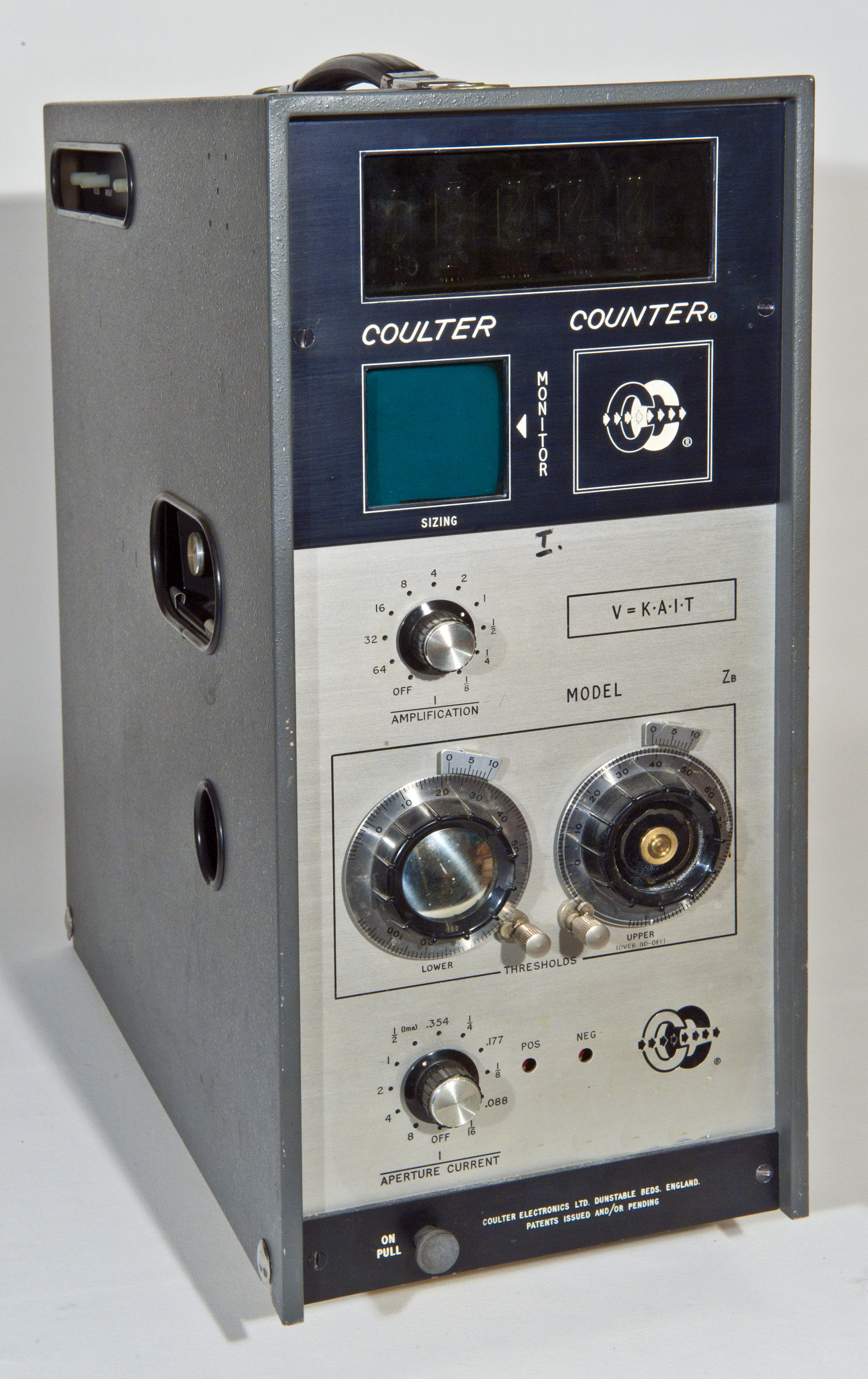
Coulter counter manufactured by Coulter Electronics Ltd., England (1960)

=== Hematology ===
The most successful and important application of the Coulter counter is in the characterization of human blood cells. The technique has been used to diagnose a variety of diseases and is the standard method for obtaining red blood cell counts (RBCs) and white blood cell counts (WBCs) as well as several other common parameters. When combined with other technologies such as fluorescence tagging and light scattering, the Coulter principle can help produce a detailed profile of a patient's blood cells.

=== Cell count and size ===
In addition to clinical counting of blood cells (cell diameters usually 6–10 micrometers), the Coulter counter has established itself as the most reliable laboratory method for counting a wide variety of cells, ranging from bacteria (<1 micrometer in size), fat cells (about 400 micrometers), stem cell embryoid bodies (about 900 micrometers), and plant cell aggregates (>1200 micrometers).

=== Particle characterization ===
Coulter counters have been used in a wide variety of fields for their ability to individually measure particles, independent of optical properties, sensitivity, and dependability. The principle has been adapted to the nanoscale to produce nanoparticle characterization techniques known as microfluidic resistive pulse sensing as well as one commercial venture which sells a technique it terms tunable resistive pulse sensing (TRPS). TRPS enables high-fidelity analysis of a diverse set of nanoparticles, including functionalized drug delivery nanoparticles, virus-like particles (VLPs), liposomes, exosomes, polymeric nanoparticles, and microbubbles.

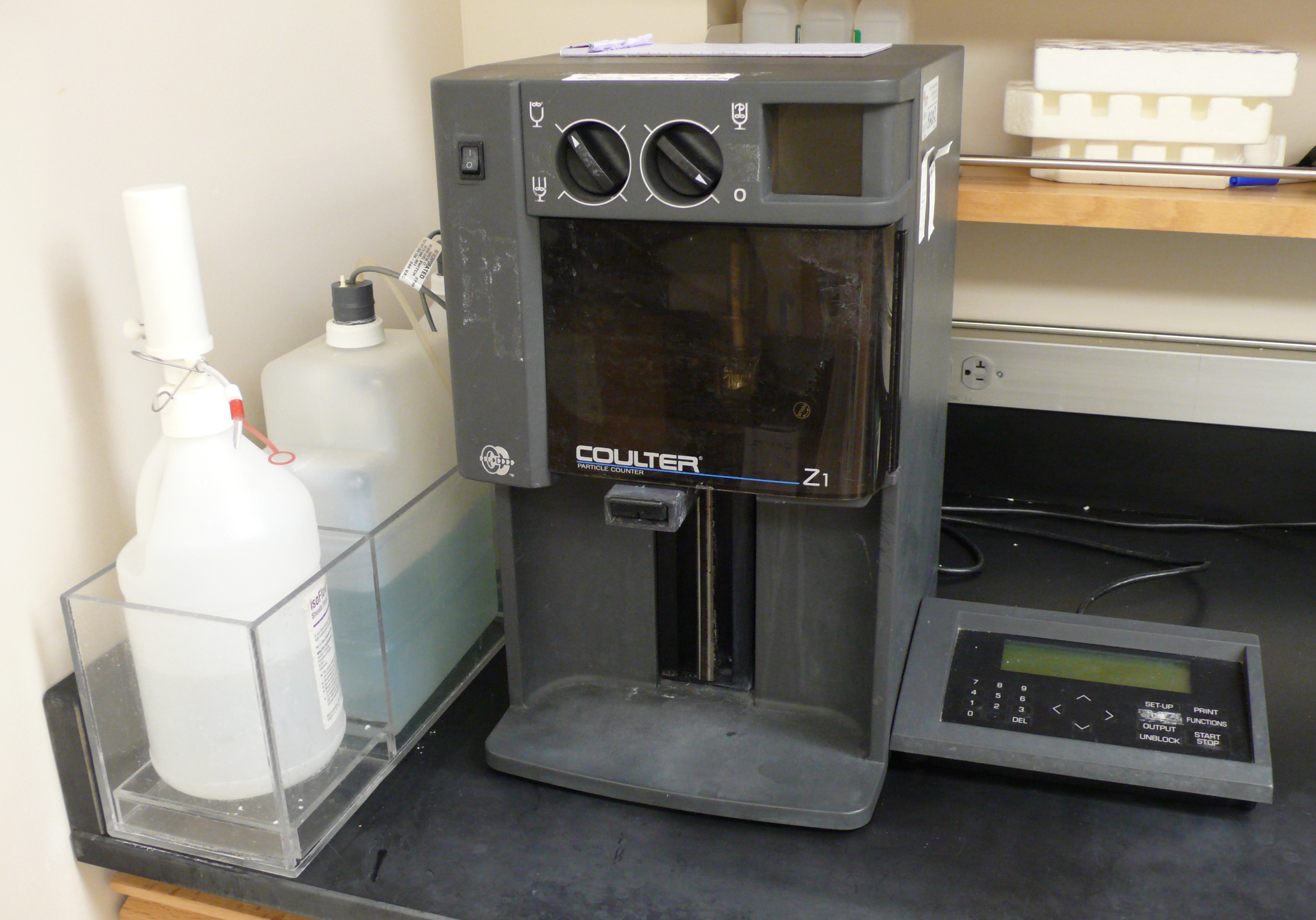
Coulter counter Model ZK

== See also ==
- Hemocytometer
- Flow cytometry
- Hematology analyzer
