= Wallace H. Coulter =

American electrical engineer, inventor and businessman

- Born: February 17, 1913; Little Rock, Arkansas, United States
- Died: August 7, 1998 (aged 85)
- Occupation(s): Engineer, inventor, businessman

Wallace H. Coulter (February 17, 1913 – August 7, 1998) was an American electrical engineer, inventor, and businessman. The best known of his 85 patents is the Coulter principle, which provides a method for counting and sizing microscopic particles suspended in fluid. His invention of the Coulter Counter made possible today's most common medical diagnostic test: the complete blood count (CBC). The Coulter principle is used in quality control of consumer products, such as chocolate and beer, paint and toners, and was even used to analyze Moon dust.

Recognized as one of the most influential inventors of the twentieth century, Wallace Coulter studied electronics as a student at Georgia Tech in the early 1930s. Mr. Coulter developed the "Coulter Principle," a theory that gave birth to both the automated hematology industry and the field of industrial fine particle counting. His "Coulter Counter," a blood cell analyzer, is used to perform one of medicine's most often-requested and informative diagnostic tests, the complete blood count.

== Early life and education ==
Coulter was born in Little Rock, Arkansas on February 17, 1913. He attended high school in McGehee, Arkansas, and went to Westminster College in Fulton, Missouri and later studied electrical engineering at the Georgia Institute of Technology.

== Coulter Corporation ==
After securing a U.S. patent (#2,656,508) for the Coulter Principle in 1953, Wallace and his brother Joseph R. Coulter (d. 1998) began the production of the new cell and particle analyzer, the Coulter Counter. Orders and sales continued to increase and, in 1958, the brothers incorporated their company as Coulter Electronics, Inc. and relocated operations to Hialeah, Florida in 1961. Coulter positioned the Coulter Corporation as the leader in the diagnostic industry. In October 1997, the Coulter Corporation was acquired by Beckman Instruments, Inc., and is now known as Beckman Coulter, Inc. Coulter Corporation continues to be one of the largest employers in Miami-Dade county with 1800 employees in 2009.

== Wallace H. Coulter Foundation ==
Coulter established the Wallace H. Coulter Foundation to improve health care through medical research and engineering. The foundation is located in Miami, Florida. In 2006 the foundation was the fifth largest in Florida with $430 million in assets and the sixth largest giver with $22 million in grants.

== Legacy ==
The science and mathematics building at Coulter's alma mater of Westminster College in Fulton, Missouri, is named the Coulter Science Center in Wallace's honor. The Wallace H. Coulter School of Engineering at Clarkson University is named after him thanks to his contributions as a trustee and due to his Foundation's contributions to the University. The Wallace H. Coulter Department of Biomedical Engineering at Georgia Tech and Emory University are also named after him. In addition, the American History Museum in Washington DC created a permanent exhibition on June 28, 2017, called the Wallace H. Coulter Unity Square.
