= LDTD =

LDTD may refer to:

- LaDainian Tomlinson, American football player (born 1979)
- Laser diode thermal desorption, an ionization technique
