= Zevaquenabant =

Chemical compound

Clinical data
- Other names: S-MRI-1867; INV-101; MRI-1867

Legal status
- Legal status: Investigational

Identifiers
- IUPAC name: (4S)-N-(1-Aminoethylidene)-5-(4-chlorophenyl)-4-phenyl-N′-[4-(trifluoromethyl)phenyl]sulfonyl-3,4-dihydropyrazole-2-carboximidamide
- CAS Number: 1998760-00-1
- PubChem CID: 155321421
- UNII: T7JYL5VB4H

Chemical and physical data
- Formula: C_{25}H_{21}ClF_{3}N_{5}O_{2}S
- Molar mass: 547.98 g·mol^{−1}

Zevaquenabant (S-MRI-1867, INV-101, or MRI-1867) is an investigational small-molecule drug, discovered by Dr George Kunos, Dr Resat Cinar, and Dr Malliga iyer at the National Institutes of Health. Zevaquenabant was described as a third generation cannabinoid receptor 1 (CB1R) antagonist due to its peripheral selectivity and polypharmacology. It acts as a peripherally selective inverse agonist of the cannabinoid receptor 1 and an inducible nitric oxide synthase (iNOS) inhibitor. It has been studied in the experimental models of fibrotic disorders such as liver fibrosis^{[1]}, chronic kidney disease, idiopathic pulmonary fibrosis, Hermansky-Pudlak syndrome pulmonary fibrosis, skin fibrosis, and metabolic disorders such as obesity^{[2]} and dyslipidemia.

== See also ==
- Monlunabant
