= Porges–Meier reaction =

Test to diagnose syphilis

Porges-Meier reaction
- Purpose: Test in the diagnosis of syphilis

Porges–Meier reaction is a precipitation test used in the diagnosis of syphilis. It is an early flocculation test for syphilis. It is named for Georg Meier and Otto Porges.

== Background ==
Precipitate formation takes place in a serum by the addition of a solution of sodium glycocholate. This reaction, according to Otto Porges, only occurs in syphilis.
