= Corey Nislow =

American geneticist

- Born: 1966 (age 59–60); New York, U.S.
- Education: New College (Sarasota, Florida), B.A. University of Colorado, PhD
- Spouse: Guri Giaever
- Scientific career
- Fields: Genetics, Genomics, Molecular Biology, Biochemistry, Drug Discovery and Development, Astrobiology
- Doctoral advisor: Richard McIntosh
- Website: https://www.ggcnlab.com

Corey Nislow is an American geneticist and molecular biologist. He is a Professor of genomics, pharmaceutical science and biochemistry at the University of British Columbia.

== Biography ==
Corey Nislow received his Bachelor of Arts in developmental biology at New College (Sarasota, Florida). In 1994, He completed his PhD in cell and molecular biology at the University of Colorado (Boulder, Colorado) under the supervision of Professor Richard McIntosh, and then pursued his postdoctoral studies at the American Cancer Society. Nislow spent 6 years working in several Bay Area biotechs and has co-led (with his spouse, Guri Giaever, who is also a professor at the University of British Columbia) genomics laboratories at Stanford University (Ronald W. Davis laboratory), University of Toronto, and University of British Columbia. He is also a co-founder of a biotech start-up, genetic networks.

== Research ==
Corey Nislow is known mainly for his efforts in the field of chemogenomics and drug research by introducing the chemogenomic technique HIP-HOP, developed by him and Guri Giaever. He has over 190 peer-reviewed publications and more than 10 US patents. He has been also working in space biology, where he studies molecular mechanisms affected by microgravity and cosmic radiation.
