= Malú G. Tansey =

American Physiologist and Neuroscientist

Malú Tansey
- Education: Stanford University; University of Texas Southwestern; Washington University in St. Louis
- Known for: TNF in neuroinflammation and degenerative disease
- Awards: 2013 GIN Faculty of the Year Award Emory University, 2000 O'Leary Prize Winner, 1991 Ida M. Green Award in Physiology
- Scientific career
- Fields: Neuroscience
- Workplaces: Indiana University

Malú G. Tansey is an American Physiologist and a professor of neurology and the James A. Caplin MD, Chair in Alzheimer’s Disease at the Indiana University School of Medicine. She is also the director of the Neuroimmunology Research Group and the executive associate director of education at the Stark Neuroscience Research Institute. Dr. Tansey joined the IU School of Medicine faculty in January 2025. As the principal investigator of the Tansey Lab, Tansey guides a research program centered around investigating the role of neuroimmune interactions in the development and progression of neurodegenerative and neuropsychiatric disease. Tansey's work is primarily focused on exploring the cellular and molecular basis of peripheral and central inflammation in the pathology of age-related neurodegenerative diseases like Alzheimer's disease and amyotrophic lateral sclerosis.

== Early life and education ==
In 1980, Tansey pursued her undergraduate education at Stanford University in Palo Alto, California. She completed her bachelor's degree in Biological Sciences and then stayed at Stanford to complete her Master's in Biological Sciences as well. After graduating in 1985, Tansey pursued her graduate studies in Physiology and Cell Cycle Regulation at the University of Texas Southwestern Medical Center. Under the mentorship of James T. Stull, Tansey explored the role of myosin light chain kinase (MLCK) phosphorylation in the regulation of smooth muscle contraction. Tansey found, early on in her PhD, that cellular mechanisms other than myosin light chain phosphorylation regulate contractile tension in smooth muscle cells. She later found that calcium dependent phosphorylation of MLCK in smooth muscle lead to decreased calcium sensitivity of phosphorylated myosin light chains. Tansey also proposed a model to understand the regulation of myosin light chain kinase phosphorylation by limited calmodulin availability.

Following the completion of her graduate studies in 1992, Tansey moved to Washington University in St. Louis, Missouri, where she worked under the mentorship of Eugene M. Johnson in the Department of Molecular Pharmacology. Tansey first explored the mechanisms of neuronal survival in cerebellar granule cells. She and her team knew that depolarizing concentrations of potassium promoted survival, so they asked whether the downstream effects of potassium influx on survival were mediated by MAP kinase or PI-3-K. They found that survival was dependent on depolarization induced PI-3-K activity. Tansey then collaborated with Jeff Milbrandt's lab in the Department of Genetics at WashU to explore the GDNF family of ligands and the biology of their intracellular signalling. The GDNF family of ligands (GFL) are neurotrophic factors found to be important in neuron survival, so Tansey and her colleagues probed the critical intracellular signalling component of the GFL receptor system, the receptor tyrosine kinase RET. They found that in order for proper RET function and thus proper GFL signalling, RET needed to be interacting with a GPI-linked co-receptor associated with a lipid raft in order for proper functioning. They further found that RET associates with members of the Src family kinases and that interaction and signalling through Src is instrumental in mediating the downstream effects of GFLs.

== Career and research ==
After completing her postdoctoral work, Tansey then moved to California to work in industry for a few years as the group leader of Chemical Genetics at Xencor Inc. in Monrovia. Her work focused on developing tumor necrosis factor (TNF) inhibitors. Tansey then returned to academia in 2002 and became an assistant professor of physiology at the University of Texas Southwestern. At UT Southwestern, Tansey continued to study the role of the cytokine TNF in CNS signalling and disease.

In 2008, Tansey was recruited to become an associate professor at Emory University in Atlanta, Georgia. Tansey became a tenured professor at Emory University, a member of the Center for Neurodegenerative Disease, and the Senior Director of Graduate Studies in Neuroscience. As a Hispanic-American, Tansey worked to increase diversity and inclusion at Emory through her role as the Director of the Emory Initiative for Maximizing Student Development.

In 2019, Tansey was recruited to the University of Florida to become the director of the Center for Translational Research in Neurodegenerative Disease. Tansey also holds the titles of Evelyn F, and William L McKnight Brain Investigator and Norman Fixel Institute for Neurological Diseases Investigator. In addition to her leadership roles at UF, Tansey is also on the board of directors for the World Parkinson Coalition.

The Tansey Lab explores the interactions between the nervous and immune systems in the context of health and disease. Tansey specifically focuses on the role of TNF in neuroinflammation and the context of Alzheimer's Disease and Parkinson's Disease. Tansey also explores the roles of microglia and brain macrophages in neurological disease pathogenesis as well as how gene-environment interactions interface with chronic inflammatory states to predispose and perpetuate diseases of the central nervous system.

=== Tumor necrosis factor signalling in disease ===
Tansey has been dedicated to exploring the role of TNF in disease and following the potential to inhibit its actions to ameliorate pathological inflammation in disease. Since TNF had been implicated in pathology, Tansey explored a method to sequester TNF in vivo to act as an inhibitor of TNF function. Tansey and her team developed a variant TNF protein that formed heterodimers with TNF in vivo rendering TNF unable to signal through TNF receptors. They found that this appeared to abrogate TNF pathology in animal models. Using this innovative TNF variant, Tansey and her team were able to probe the role of TNF in Alzheimer's Disease and Parkinson's Disease. They found that when they blocked TNF signalling using the variant TNF technology, they were able to attenuate progressive pathology and even reduce microglial activation, which was associated with the loss of dopamine neurons in PD. These findings suggested that targeting TNF might be a promising strategy to prevent the loss of dopamine neurons in PD and also prevent neuronal pathology on AD.

=== Chronic inflammation and neurodegeneration ===
Tansey is a pioneer in the exploration of how chronic inflammation predisposes and perpetuates neurological disease. Contrary to previous reports, the immune system does exist in the central nervous system, and the major orchestrators of this immune response are the innate immune cells of the brain called microglia. Short term activation of inflammation in the brain is present in disease, injury, or infection, and is useful in response to disease states, but if this inflammation is prolonged, it can lead to neuronal death. Tansey has helped to educate the field on the concept of acute versus chronic brain inflammation, the purposes and roles of this inflammation, and its relation to chronic neurological diseases. She emphasizes that microglia lie at a convergence point where stimuli can impact microglial activation and thus lead to aberrant brain inflammation and neuronal death in this way. Tansey showed that the microglial GTPase RGS10 might play a protective role in a chronic inflammatory environment. When RGS10 was knocked out in mice with chronic systemic inflammation, it led to overproduction of proinflammatory cytokines by microglia and death of dopaminergic neurons. Since removal of RGS10 in dopaminergic neurons also made them more sensitive to the proinflammatory cytokines released by microglia, Tansey proposed RGS10 as a therapeutic target for PD.

Tansey also explores the role of gene-environment interactions, or epigenetic mechanisms in neurodegenerative disease pathology and chronic inflammation. She probed how diet effects immune infiltration into the brain since previous studies had shown that it might lead to compromised blood brain barrier function and increased immune cell infiltration into the CNS. Conversely, her findings showed that high fat high fructose diets did not increase peripheral trafficking of immune cells into the CNS. Tansey also explored the sex-specific effects of stress on neuro-immune reactivity and found that early life chronic stress led to increased neuro-immune reactivity but via different mechanisms in male versus female rats.

== Awards and honors ==
- 2019 Keynote Address at the Alzheimer's Association International Conference-Satellite Symposium
- 2013 GIN Faculty of the Year Award Emory University
- 2000 O'Leary Prize Winner
- 1991 Ida M. Green Award in Physiology

== Select publications ==
- Fournier, Christina N.; Houser, Madelyn; Tansey, Malú G.; Glass, Jonathan D.; Hertzberg, Vicki Stover (February 2020). "The gut microbiome and neuroinflammation in amyotrophic lateral sclerosis? Emerging clinical evidence". Neurobiology of Disease. 135 104300. doi:10.1016/j.nbd.2018.10.007. PMID 30321601. S2CID 53040941.
- Butkovich, Laura M.; Houser, Madelyn C.; Tansey, Malú G. (11 September 2018). "α-Synuclein and Noradrenergic Modulation of Immune Cells in Parkinson's Disease Pathogenesis". Frontiers in Neuroscience. 12 626. doi:10.3389/fnins.2018.00626. PMC 6143806. PMID 30258347.
- Manfredsson, Fredric P.; Tansey, Malú G.; Golde, Todd E. (1 October 2018). "Challenges in Passive Immunization Strategies to Treat Parkinson Disease". JAMA Neurology. 75 (10): 1180–1181. doi:10.1001/jamaneurol.2018.0346. PMID 29913004. S2CID 49298522.
- Felger, Jennifer C.; Haroon, Ebrahim; Patel, Trusharth A.; Goldsmith, David R.; Wommack, Evanthia C.; Woolwine, Bobbi J.; Le, Ngoc-Anh; Feinberg, Rachel; Tansey, Malu G.; Miller, Andrew H. (12 June 2018). "What does plasma CRP tell us about peripheral and central inflammation in depression?". Molecular Psychiatry. 25 (6): 1301–1311. doi:10.1038/s41380-018-0096-3. PMC 6291384. PMID 29895893.
- Houser, Madelyn C.; Tansey, Malú G. (11 January 2017). "The gut-brain axis: is intestinal inflammation a silent driver of Parkinson's disease pathogenesis?". npj Parkinson's Disease. 3 (1): 3. doi:10.1038/s41531-016-0002-0. PMC 5445611. PMID 28649603.
- Barnum, Christopher J.; Chen, Xi; Chung, Jaegwon; Chang, Jianjun; Williams, Martha; Grigoryan, Nelly; Tesi, Raymond J.; Tansey, Malú G. (2014). "Peripheral Administration of the Selective Inhibitor of Soluble Tumor Necrosis Factor (TNF) XPro 1595 Attenuates Nigral Cell Loss and Glial Activation in 6-OHDA Hemiparkinsonian Rats". Journal of Parkinson's Disease. 4 (3): 349–360. doi:10.3233/JPD-140410. PMC 4154985. PMID 25061061.
- Nguyen, Thi A; Frank-Cannon, Tamy; Martinez, Terina N; Ruhn, Kelly A; Marvin, Marian; Casey, Bradford; Treviño, Isaac; Hong, John J; Goldberg, Matthew S; Tansey, Malú G (28 April 2013). "Analysis of inflammation-related nigral degeneration and locomotor function in DJ-1 −/− mice". Journal of Neuroinflammation. 10 (1): 50. doi:10.1186/1742-2094-10-50. PMC 3769147. PMID 23622116.
- Harms, Ashley S.; Lee, Jae-Kyung; Nguyen, Thi A.; Chang, Jianjun; Ruhn, Kelly M.; Treviño, Isaac; Tansey, Malú G. (February 2012). "Regulation of microglia effector functions by tumor necrosis factor signaling". Glia. 60 (2): 189–202. doi:10.1002/glia.21254. PMC 3232308. PMID 21989628.
- Tran, Thi A.; Nguyen, Andrew D.; Chang, Jianjun; Goldberg, Matthew S.; Lee, Jae-Kyung; Tansey, Malú G.; Mattson, Mark P. (17 August 2011). "Lipopolysaccharide and Tumor Necrosis Factor Regulate Parkin Expression via Nuclear Factor-Kappa B". PLOS ONE. 6 (8) e23660. Bibcode:2011PLoSO...623660T. doi:10.1371/journal.pone.0023660. PMC 3157435. PMID 21858193.
- Lee, J.-K.; McCoy, M. K.; Harms, A. S.; Ruhn, K. A.; Gold, S. J.; Tansey, M. G. (20 August 2008). "Regulator of G-Protein Signaling 10 Promotes Dopaminergic Neuron Survival via Regulation of the Microglial Inflammatory Response". Journal of Neuroscience. 28 (34): 8517–8528. doi:10.1523/JNEUROSCI.1806-08.2008. PMC 2739568. PMID 18716210.
- Tansey, Malu G.; Frank-Cannon, TC; McCoy, MK; Lee, JK; Martinez, TN; McAlpine, FE; Ruhn, KA; Tran, TA (2008). "Neuroinflammation in Parkinson's Disease: Is there sufficient evidence for mechanism-based interventional therapy?". Frontiers in Bioscience. 13 (13): 709–17. doi:10.2741/2713. PMID 17981581.
- McCoy, M. K.; Martinez, TN; Ruhn, KA; Szymkowski, DE; Smith, CG; Botterman, BR; Tansey, KE; Tansey, MG (13 September 2006). "Blocking Soluble Tumor Necrosis Factor Signaling with Dominant-Negative Tumor Necrosis Factor Inhibitor Attenuates Loss of Dopaminergic Neurons in Models of Parkinson's Disease". Journal of Neuroscience. 26 (37): 9365–9375. doi:10.1523/JNEUROSCI.1504-06.2006. PMC 3707118. PMID 16971520.
