= MAD2L1BP =

Protein-coding gene in the species Homo sapiens

Available structures
PDB	Ortholog search: PDBe RCSB
PDB	List of PDB id codes 2QYF

Identifiers
- Aliases: MAD2L1BP, CMT2, MAD2L1 binding protein
- External IDs: OMIM: 618136; MGI: 1913841; HomoloGene: 11990; GeneCards: MAD2L1BP; OMA:MAD2L1BP - orthologs

Gene location (Human)
Chr.	Chromosome 6 (human)
Band	6p21.1	Start	43,629,540 bp
Band	6p21.1	End	43,640,941 bp

Gene location (Mouse)
Chr.	Chromosome 17 (mouse)
Band	17|17 C	Start	46,458,313 bp
Band	17|17 C	End	46,464,479 bp
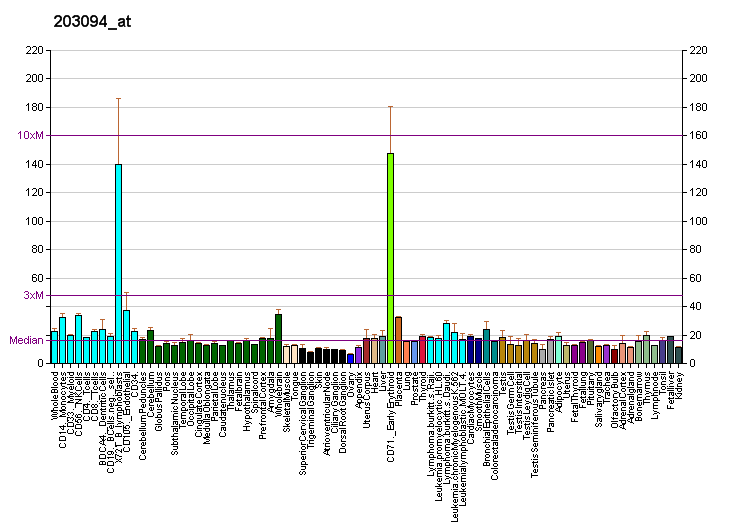
RNA expression pattern
Bgee	Human / Mouse (ortholog); Top expressed in: mucosa of transverse colon; oocyte; rectum; islet of Langerhans; gastrocnemius muscle; granulocyte; monocyte; left ventricle; apex of heart; olfactory zone of nasal mucosa / Top expressed in: Ileal epithelium; morula; morula; soleus muscle; fetal liver hematopoietic progenitor cell; blastocyst; yolk sac; granulocyte; sternocleidomastoid muscle; temporal muscle; More reference expression data
BioGPS	More reference expression data
Gene ontology
Molecular function	protein binding
Cellular component	cytoplasm; spindle; cytoskeleton; nucleus; nucleolus; nuclear membrane
Biological process	regulation of exit from mitosis; mitotic cell cycle checkpoint signaling
Sources:Amigo / QuickGO
Orthologs
Species	Human	Mouse
Entrez	9587	66591
Ensembl	ENSG00000124688	ENSMUSG00000034509
UniProt	Q15013	Q9DCX1
RefSeq (mRNA)	NM_014628; NM_001003690	NM_025649
RefSeq (protein)	NP_001003690; NP_055443	NP_079925
Location (UCSC)	Chr 6: 43.63 – 43.64 Mb	Chr 17: 46.46 – 46.46 Mb
PubMed search
- Wikidata
View/Edit Human	View/Edit Mouse

MAD2L1-binding protein is a protein that in humans is encoded by the MAD2L1BP gene.

== Function ==
The protein encoded by this gene was identified as a binding protein of the MAD2 mitotic arrest deficient-like 1 (MAD2/MAD2L1). MAD2 is a key component of the spindle checkpoint that delays the onset of anaphase until all the kinetochores are attached to the spindle. This protein may interact with the spindle checkpoint and coordinate cell cycle events in late mitosis. Alternatively spliced transcript variants encoding distinct isoforms have been observed.

== Interactions ==
MAD2L1BP has been shown to interact with TRIP13.
