= Photoaffinity labeling =

Molecular biology technique

Photoaffinity labeling is a chemoproteomics technique used to attach "labels" to the active site of a large molecule, especially a protein. The "label" attaches to the molecule loosely and reversibly, and has an inactive site which can be converted using photolysis into a highly reactive form, which causes the label to bind more permanently to the large molecule via a covalent bond. The technique was first described in the 1970s. Molecules that have been used as labels in this process are often analogs of complex molecules, in which certain functional groups are replaced with a photoreactive group, such as an azide, a diazirine or a benzophenone.
