= Monlunabant =

Chemical compound

Clinical data
- Other names: INV-202, MRI-1891

Legal status
- Legal status: Investigational

Identifiers
- IUPAC name: N-[(E)-N′-[(Z)-C-[(4S)-5-(4-Chlorophenyl)-4-phenyl-3,4-dihydropyrazol-2-yl]-N-[4-(trifluoromethyl)phenyl]sulfonylcarbonimidoyl]carbamimidoyl]acetamide
- CAS Number: 2712480-46-9
- PubChem CID: 164888943
- ChemSpider: 128942559
- UNII: 4G8X27X87A

Chemical and physical data
- Formula: C_{26}H_{22}ClF_{3}N_{6}O_{3}S
- Molar mass: 591.01 g·mol^{−1}
- 3D model (JSmol): Interactive image
- SMILES: CC(=O)N/C(=N/C(=N/S(=O)(=O)C1=CC=C(C=C1)C(F)(F)F)/N2C[C@@H](C(=N2)C3=CC=C(C=C3)Cl)C4=CC=CC=C4)/N
- InChI: InChI=1S/C26H22ClF3N6O3S/c1-16(37)32-24(31)33-25(35-40(38,39)21-13-9-19(10-14-21)26(28,29)30)36-15-22(17-5-3-2-4-6-17)23(34-36)18-7-11-20(27)12-8-18/h2-14,22H,15H2,1H3,(H3,31,32,33,35,37)/t22-/m1/s1; Key:GYJPQNPVIJXXTA-JOCHJYFZSA-N

Monlunabant (INV-202, MRI-1891, or S-MRI-1891) is a peripherally selective cannabinoid receptor 1 inverse agonist, discovered as a β-arrestin-2-biased cannabinoid receptor 1 antagonist by Dr George Kunos, Dr Resat Cinar, and Dr Malliga Iyer at the National Institutes of Health. It was developed as a weight loss drug by Inversago Pharma.

Novo Nordisk’s obesity drug monlunabant showed only modest weight loss in a Phase 2a trial. The drug was associated with higher rates of mild to moderate neuropsychiatric side effects like anxiety and sleep disturbances. Suicidal ideations were not reported.

== See also ==
- Zevaquenabant
