= Cellular thermal shift assay =

Chemoproteomics method

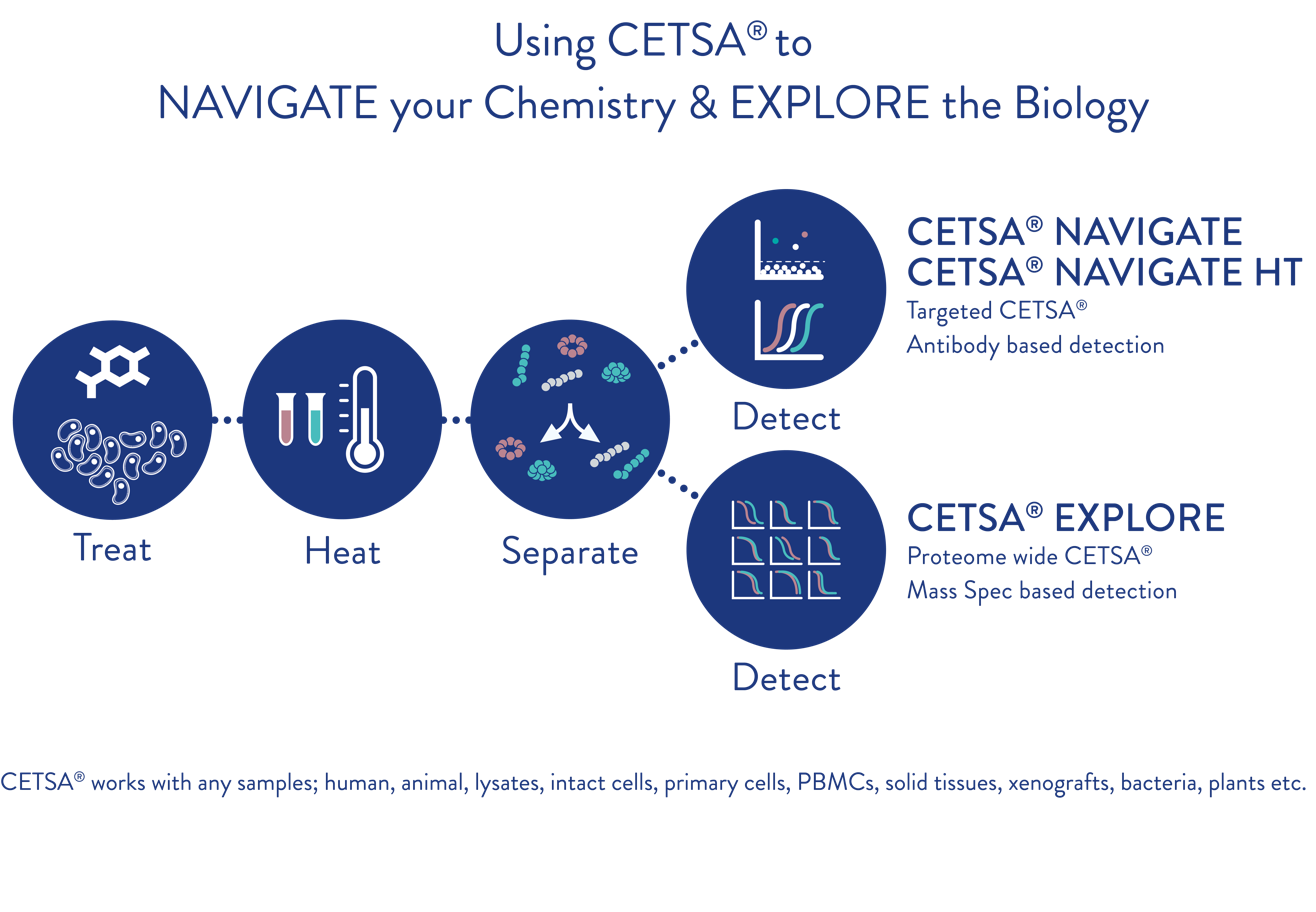

CEllular Thermal Shift Assay (CETSA^{®}) is a patented label free chemoproteomics method that has enabled measurements of compound target engagement in intact cells and tissue, without modifications to the target protein. This is accomplished by comparing the measured cellular thermal stability of the protein in the presence and absence of the test compound. An efficacious compound binding to its intended target will affect associated proteins and thereby leave traces in the cell in form of changed signalling patterns. Such patterns can arise from for example loss or gain of protein-protein interactions, phosphorylations or release of regulatory molecules.
