= Laser diode thermal desorption =

Ionization technique

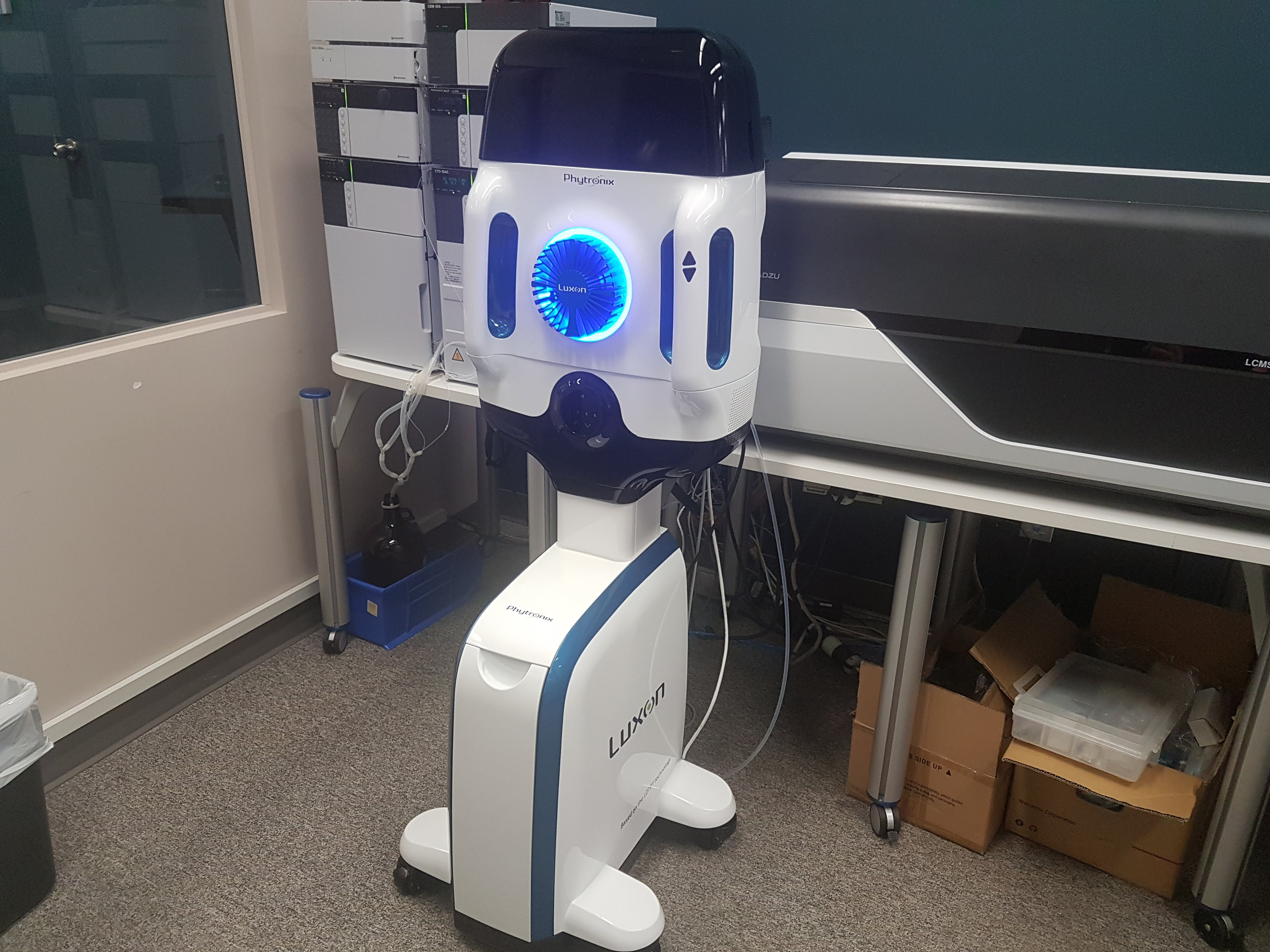
Luxon Ion Source installed on a Shimadzu mass spectrometer

Laser diode thermal desorption (LDTD) is an ionization technique that is coupled to mass spectrometry to analyze samples with atmospheric pressure chemical ionization (APCI). It uses a laser to thermally desorb analytes that are deposited on a stainless steel sheet sample holder, called LazWell. The coupling of LDTD and APCI is considered to be a soft-ionization technique. With LDTD-APCI, it is possible to analyze samples in forensics, pharmaceuticals, environment, food and clinical studies. LDTD is suitable for small molecules between 0 and 1200 Da and some peptides such as cyclosporine.

== History ==
In 2005, a patent was filed by Phytronix Technologies Inc., from Quebec, Canada, for the LDTD ion source for mass spectrometry. In 2016, the Luxon Ion Source, based on the same technology, was put on the market.

== Principle of operation ==
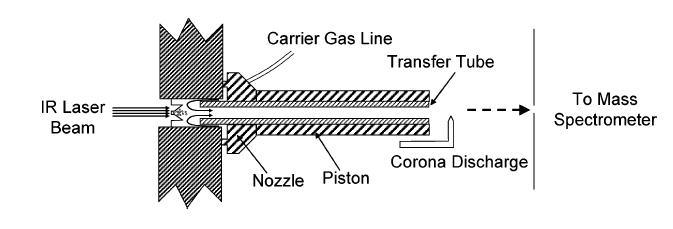
Schematic of the LDTD technology

An aliquot of the sample preparation between 1 and 10 μL is deposited with a pipette into the well of a metal sample holder and dried with a temperature between room temperature and 40 degrees Celsius. After the sample is completely dried, the sample holder is inserted into the ion source. Compared with desorption electrospray ionization (DESI), direct analysis in real time (DART) and matrix-assisted laser desorption/ionization (MALDI), where the droplets, gas or laser come into direct contact with the sample, LDTD relies on heat transfer through a metal surface. An infrared laser diode array (980 nm) is collimated to heat the back of the sample holder causing the desorption of the molecules. The gas-phase neutral molecules are then transported through a transfer tube, which is pneumatically and sequentially inserted into each well, with a carrier gas into a corona discharge region to undergo an atmospheric pressure ionization. The ions enter the mass spectrometer through the inlet to be measured by the detector. This whole process takes between 0.7 and 10 seconds depending on the laser pattern and the method created by the user. The carrier gas used is compressed air which contains a concentration of water between 3 and 1800 ppm to be able to efficiently protonate the molecules.

Adding to the mass spectrometer's software-controlled parameters, three other parameters can be varied to achieve a higher sensibility or reproducibility: the carrier gas flow, the laser power and the laser gradient. An important part of the analysis is also the sample preparation. The most common sample preparation methods used with LDTD are liquid-liquid extraction (LLE), protein precipitation, solid phase extraction (SPE) or a dilution.

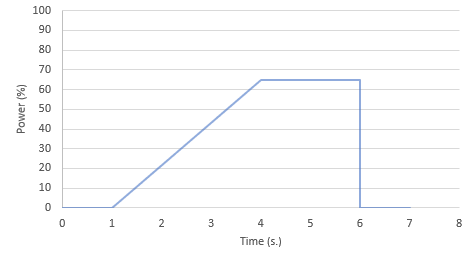
Typical laser pattern used with LDTD

=== Ionization mechanism ===
Since LDTD is always coupled to APCI, the same ionization mechanism happens. The main difference is that no solvent or mobile phase is available and the protons come from the water content of the carrier gas. A water concentration between 3 and 1800 ppm is recommended.

The ionization can be done in negative or positive mode.

In some applications, such as the analysis of tacrolimus in whole blood, ammonium hydroxide is added to the carrier gas to modify the ionization process.

=== Sample holder ===
The sample holders that can be inserted in LDTD ion sources are named LazWell and are specially designed 96, 384 or 1536-well plates. Different coatings can be applied depending on the molecules being analyzed. The hexagonal well shape is designed to concentrate the sample in the path of the laser for an optimal desorption.

== Advantages ==
Since no solvent or mobile phase carries the sample, this technique is characterized by a highly efficient protonation and a strong resistance to ionic suppression. This and the fact that no needle touches the samples adds the benefit of eliminating carry over between the different wells of the plate. The technology is also a good alternative for the traditional LC-MS users since the results give a similar peak shape as in liquid chromatography and it significantly reduces the analysis time. It also uses low volumes of samples, which is an asset in applications where the available sample volume is limited or difficult to acquire. In addition, it is deemed to be an environmentally friendly alternative to LC-MS/MS.

The ion sources, LDTD and Luxon Ion Source, can be attached to different mass spectrometers with its adapted source housing, available for multiple manufacturers, such as triple quadrupole, time-of-flight, and orbitrap mass spectrometers.

On the downside, since no chromatographic separation is done, interferences coming from isobaric compounds may occur in heavily charged matrices. Differential ion mobility spectrometry-mass spectrometry (DMS-MS) or high-resolution mass spectrometry (HRMS) can be used in tandem with LDTD to eliminate these interferences.

== Disadvantages ==
While it only requires a small volume of sample, this technique results in a destruction of that sample. The manual sample placing required can cause a variation in results achieved. Care must be taken when designing methods within an experiment using this technology as the lack of chromatography can cause the inability to analyze isomers.
