= Microbead (research) =

Uniform polymer particles

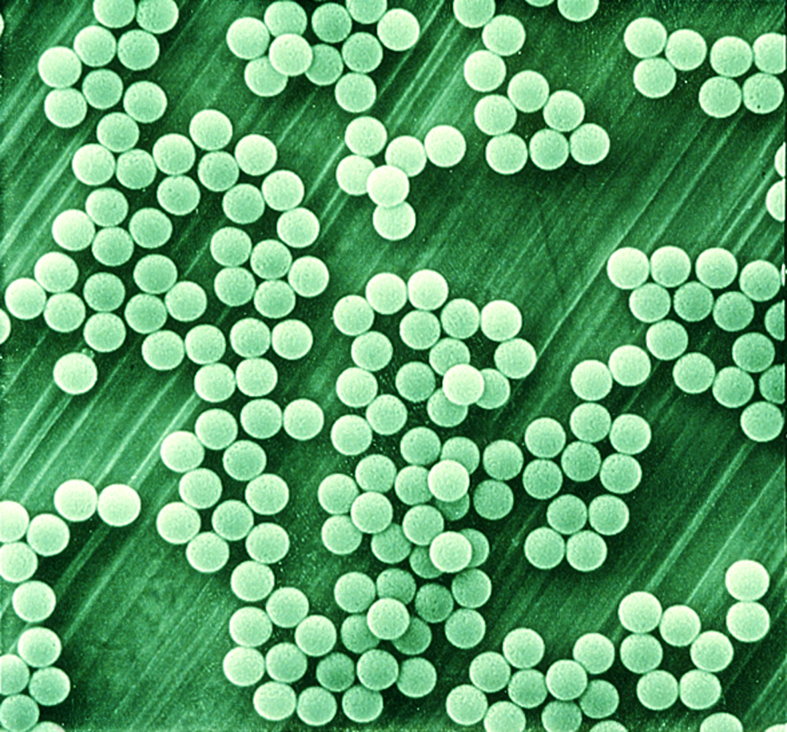
Superparamagnetic microbeads: the monosized Dynabeads (scanning electron microscope image)

Microbeads, also called Ugelstad particles after the Norwegian chemist, professor John Ugelstad, who invented them in 1977 and patented the method in 1978, are uniform polymer particles, typically 0.5 to 500 microns in diameter. Bio-reactive molecules can be absorbed or coupled to their surface, and used to separate biological materials such as cells, proteins, or nucleic acids.

Microbeads have been used for isolation and handling of specific material or molecules, as well as for analyzing sensitive molecules, or those that are in low abundance, e.g. in miniaturized and automated settings.

== Background ==
Microbeads were created when John Ugelstad managed to form polystyrene beads of the same spherical sizes at the Norwegian University of Science and Technology (NTNU) in 1977. A few years later, he created superparamagnetic microbeads (Dynabeads), which exhibit magnetic properties when placed in a magnetic field. When they are removed from the magnetic field, there is no residual magnetism, which led to the development of magnetic separation technology. Other processes such as centrifugation, filtration, columns, or precipitation are not needed.

Microbeads display a large surface area per volume. This, together with uniformity of size and shape, provides for very good accessibility and fast liquid-phase reaction kinetics, and rapid and efficient binding.

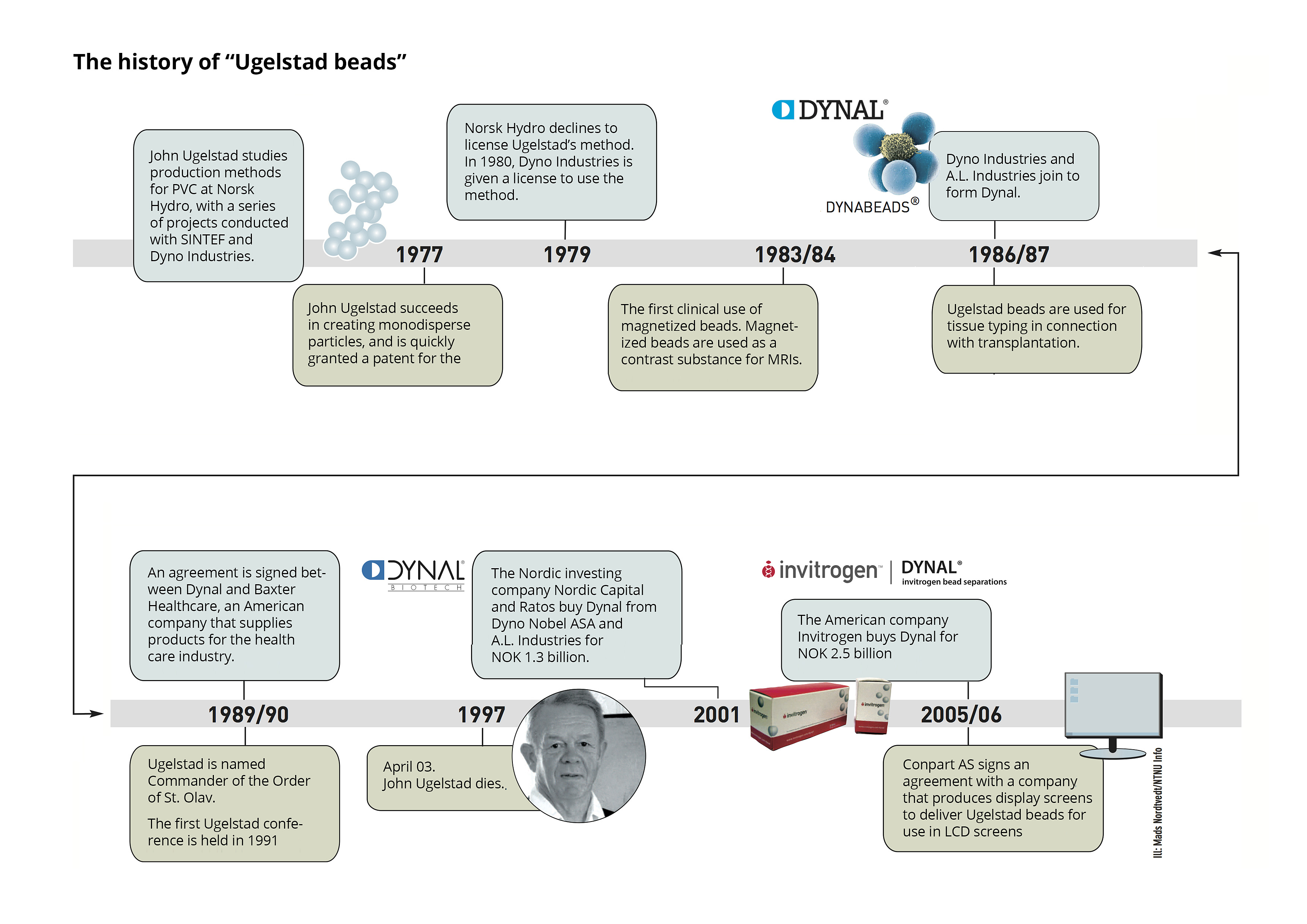
The history of the «Ugelstad particles» 1977–2006 (graphics: NTNU/Mads Nortvedt)

== Use ==
Black polyethylene microspheres can have magnetic or conductive functionality, and have uses in electronic devices, EMI shielding, and microscopy techniques.

Fluorescent polyethylene microspheres are commonly used to run blind tests on laboratory and industrial processes, in order to develop proper methods and minimize cross-contamination of equipment and materials. Microspheres that appear to be invisible in the daylight can be illuminated to display a bright fluorescent response under UV light.

Colored polyethylene microspheres are used for fluid flow visualization to enable observation and characterization of flow of particles in a device or be used as visible markers in microscopy and biotechnology.

== Applications ==
Microbeads serve as the main tool for bio-magnetic separations. A range of patented processes and applications have been developed based on the use of microbeads in academic and industrial research. Microbeads are pre-coupled with a ligand; a biomolecule such as antibody, streptavidin, protein, antigen, DNA/RNA, or other molecule. There are three steps involved in the magnetic separation process:

1. Bind – Microbeads bind to the desired target, relative to the specific affinity of the ligand on the surface of the beads.
2. Wash – Microbeads will move to the side of the tube in response to a magnetic field, along with the bound material. This happens quickly and efficiently because of the magnetic field and the micro-sized particles. The un-bound and un-wanted material that is left behind in the sample is removed by pipetting/aspiration. The bead-bound material is washed using the appropriate buffers, by applying the magnet.
3. Elute – Once the bead-bound target is isolated and washed, it can be released in the appropriate solution and desired volume. It can then be used for any downstream application directly, or the microbeads can be released and removed.

Microbeads are used for cell isolation and cell expansion. Proteins and protein complexes can be separated; e.g., in immunoprecipitation protocols. Molecular studies and diagnostics also benefit from microbeads (e.g. immunoassay IVD and nucleic acid IVD). When microbeads are coupled with streptavidin, they offer a very efficient way to isolate any biotinylated molecule. This is frequently used in DNA/RNA binding protein studies, sequencing, and to prepare single stranded templates. Gene expression analysis also benefits from microbeads, such as isolating mRNA for transcriptional analysis.

There are many uses for microbeads, mostly for biotechnology and biomedical research. Microbeads and magnetic separation technology have enabled a range of innovative methods to benefit research on disease prevention, medicine, and other fields to improve the human condition.

== See also ==
- Microspheres
