= Chemogenomics =

Novel drug development method

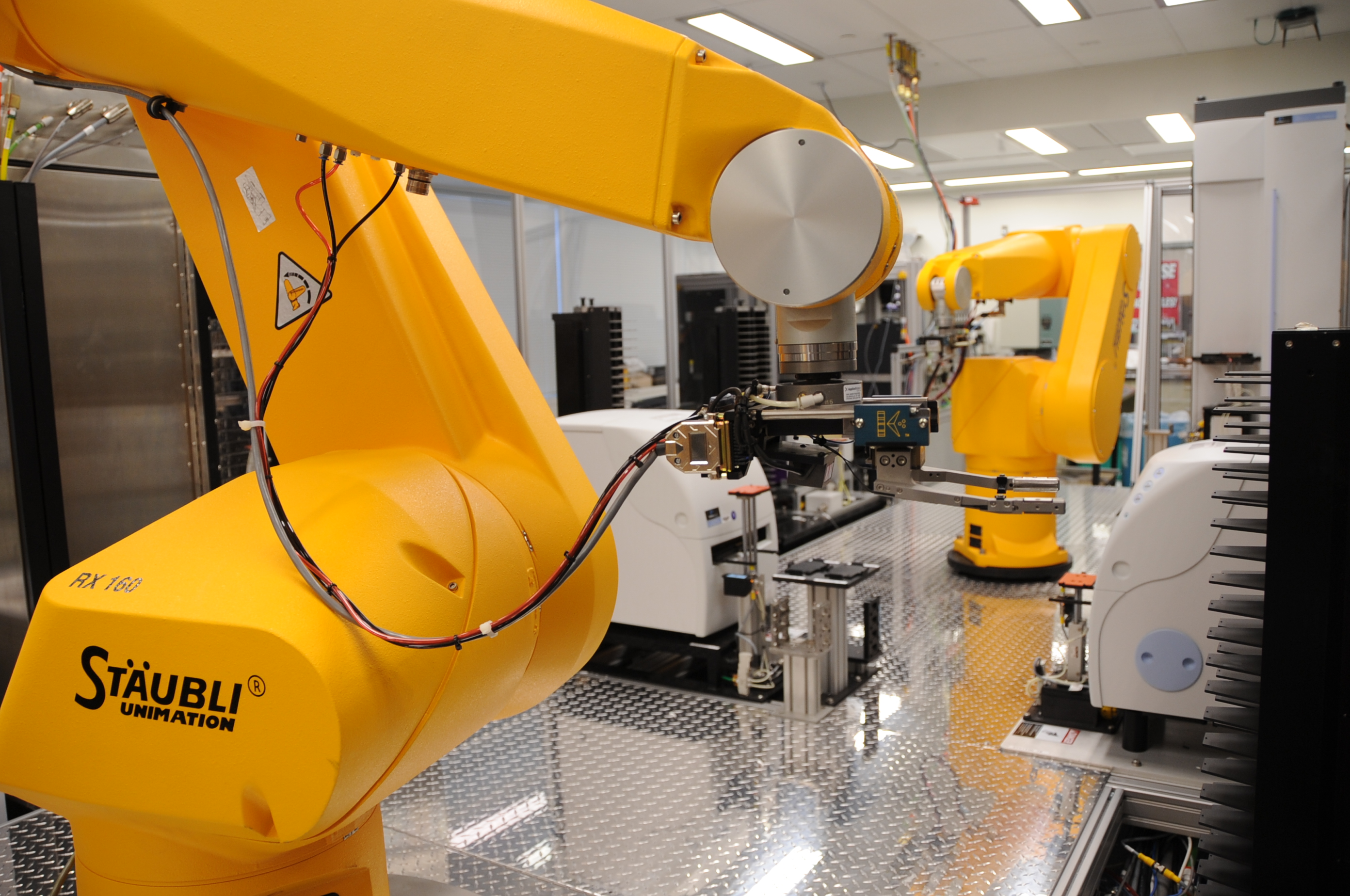
Chemogenomics Staubli robot retrieves assay plates from incubators

Chemogenomics, or chemical genomics, is the systematic screening of targeted chemical libraries of small molecules against individual drug target families (e.g., GPCRs, nuclear receptors, kinases, proteases, etc.) with the ultimate goal of identification of novel drugs and drug targets. Typically some members of a target library have been well characterized where both the function has been determined and compounds that modulate the function of those targets (ligands in the case of receptors, inhibitors of enzymes, or blockers of ion channels) have been identified. Other members of the target family may have unknown function with no known ligands and hence are classified as orphan receptors. By identifying screening hits that modulate the activity of the less well characterized members of the target family, the function of these novel targets can be elucidated. Furthermore, the hits for these targets can be used as a starting point for drug discovery. The completion of the human genome project has provided an abundance of potential targets for therapeutic intervention. Chemogenomics strives to study the intersection of all possible drugs on all of these potential targets.

A common method to construct a targeted chemical library is to include known ligands of at least one and preferably several members of the target family. Since a portion of ligands that were designed and synthesized to bind to one family member will also bind to additional family members, the compounds contained in a targeted chemical library should collectively bind to a high percentage of the target family.

== Strategy ==
Chemogenomics integrates target and drug discovery by using active compounds, which function as ligands, as probes to characterize proteome functions. The interaction between a small compound and a protein induces a phenotype. Once the phenotype is characterized, we could associate a protein to a molecular event. Compared with genetics, chemogenomics techniques are able to modify the function of a protein rather than the gene. Also, chemogenomics is able to observe the interaction as well as reversibility in real-time. For example, the modification of a phenotype can be observed only after addition of a specific compound and can be interrupted after its withdrawal from the medium.

Currently, there are two experimental chemogenomic approaches: forward (classical) chemogenomics and reverse chemogenomics. Forward chemogenomics attempt to identify drug targets by searching for molecules which give a certain phenotype on cells or animals, while reverse chemogenomics aim to validate phenotypes by searching for molecules that interact specifically with a given protein. Both of these approaches require a suitable collection of compounds and an appropriate model system for screening the compounds and looking for the parallel identification of biological targets and biologically active compounds. The biologically active compounds that are discovered through forward or reverse chemogenomics approaches are known as modulators because they bind to and modulate specific molecular targets, thus they could be used as ‘targeted therapeutics’.

=== Forward chemogenomics ===
In forward chemogenomics, which is also known as classical chemogenomics, a particular phenotype is studied and small compound interacting with this function are identified. The molecular basis of this desired phenotype is unknown. Once the modulators have been identified, they will be used as tools to look for the protein responsible for the phenotype. For example, a loss-of-function phenotype could be an arrest of tumor growth. Once compounds that lead to a target phenotype have been identified, identifying the gene and protein targets should be the next step. The main challenge of forward chemogenomics strategy lies in designing phenotypic assays that lead immediately from screening to target identification.

=== Reverse chemogenomics ===
In reverse chemogenomics, small compounds that perturb the function of an enzyme in the context of an in vitro enzymatic test will be identified. Once the modulators have been identified, the phenotype induced by the molecule is analyzed in a test on cells or on whole organisms. This method will identify or confirm the role of the enzyme in the biological response. Reverse chemogenomics used to be virtually identical to the target-based approaches that have been applied in drug discovery and molecular pharmacology over the past decade. This strategy is now enhanced by parallel screening and by the ability to perform lead optimization on many targets that belong to one target family.

== Applications ==
=== Determining mode of action ===
Chemogenomics has been used to identify mode of action (MOA) for traditional Chinese medicine (TCM) and Ayurveda. Compounds contained in traditional medicines are usually more soluble than synthetic compounds, have “privileged structures” (chemical structures that are more frequently found to bind in different living organisms), and have more comprehensively known safety and tolerance factors. Therefore, this makes them especially attractive as a resource for lead structures in when developing new molecular entities. Databases containing chemical structures of compounds used in alternative medicine along with their phenotypic effects, in silico analysis may be of use to assist in determining MOA for example, by predicting ligand targets that were relevant to known phenotypes for traditional medicines. In a case study for TCM, the therapeutic class of ‘toning and replenishing medicine” was evaluated. Therapeutic actions (or phenotypes) for that class include anti-inflammatory, antioxidant, neuroprotective, hypoglycemic activity, immunomodulatory, antimetastatic, and hypotensive. Sodium-glucose transport proteins and PTP1B (an insulin signaling regulator) were identified as targets which link to the hypoglycemic phenotype suggested. The case study for Ayurveda involved anti-cancer formulations. In this case, the target prediction program enriched for targets directly connected to cancer progression such as steroid-5-alpha-reductase and synergistic targets like the efflux pump P-gp. These target-phenotype links can help identify novel MOAs.

Beyond TCM and Ayurveda, chemogenomics can be applied early in drug discovery to determine a compound's mechanism of action and take advantage of genomic biomarkers of toxicity and efficacy for application to Phase I and II clinical trials.

=== Identifying new drug targets ===
Chemogenomics profiling can be used to identify totally new therapeutic targets, for example new antibacterial agents. The study capitalized on the availability of an existing ligand library for an enzyme called murD that is used in the peptidoglycan synthesis pathway. Relying on the chemogenomics similarity principle, the researchers mapped the murD ligand library to other members of the mur ligase family (murC, murE, murF, murA, and murG) to identify new targets for the known ligands. Ligands identified would be expected to be broad-spectrum Gram-negative inhibitors in experimental assays since peptidoglycan synthesis is exclusive to bacteria. Structural and molecular docking studies revealed candidate ligands for murC and murE ligases.

=== Identifying genes in biological pathway ===
Thirty years after the posttranslationally modified histidine derivative diphthamide was determined, chemogenomics was used to discover the enzyme responsible for the final step in its synthesis. Dipthamide is a posttranslationally modified histidine residue found on the translation elongation factor 2 (eEF-2). The first two steps of the biosynthesis pathway leading to dipthine have been known, but the enzyme responsible for the amidation of dipthine to diphthamide remained a mystery. The researchers capitalized on Saccharomyces cerevisiae cofitness data. Cofitness data is data representing the similarity of growth fitness under various conditions between any two different deletion strains. Under the assumption that strains lacking the diphthamide synthetase gene should have high cofitness with strain lacking other diphthamide biosynthesis genes, they identified ylr143w as the strain with the highest cofitness to the all other strains lacking known diphthamide biosynthesis genes. Subsequent experimental assays confirmed that YLR143W was required for diphthamide synthesis and was the missing diphthamide synthetase.

== See also ==
- Chemical biology
- Chemical genetics
- Drug discovery
- High-throughput screening
- Personalized medicine
- Phenotypic screening
