= Polypharmacology =

Polypharmacology is the design or use of pharmaceutical agents that act on multiple targets or disease pathways.

Despite scientific advancements and an increase of global R&D spending, drugs are frequently withdrawn from markets. This is primarily due to their side effects or toxicities. Drug molecules often interact with multiple targets and the unintended drug-target interactions can cause side effects. Polypharmacology remains to be one of the major challenges in drug development, and it opens novel avenues to rationally design the next generation of more effective but less toxic therapeutic agents. Polypharmacology suggests that more effective drugs can be developed by specifically modulating multiple targets.

It is generally thought that complex diseases such as cancer and central nervous system diseases may require complex therapeutic approaches. In this respect, a drug that "hits" multiple sensitive nodes belonging to a network of interacting targets offers the potential for higher efficacy and may limit drawbacks generally arising from the use of a single-target drug or a combination of multiple drugs. In contrast, chemical biology continues to be a reductionist discipline, still regarding chemical probes as highly selective small molecules that enable the modulation and study of one specific target. Chemical biology cannot continue to overlook the existence of polypharmacologytext and its urge to become a more holistic discipline that looks at the use of tool compounds from a systems perspective. The use of chemoproteomics offers strategies to develop a more holistic understanding of the proteome-wide range of targets a drug interacts with.

The primordial idea of polypharmacology was first proposed in 2004 by Bryan Roth. He reasoned that most common central nervous system disorders are polygenic in origin, and attempts to develop more effective treatments for diseases such as schizophrenia and depression by discovering drugs selective for single molecular targets ('magic bullets') have been largely unsuccessful. He therefore proposed a proof of concept that designing selectively non-selective drugs (that is, 'magic shotguns') that interact with several molecular targets will lead to new and more effective medications for a variety of central nervous system disorders.

A similar concept was independently proposed in the year of 2006 by Professor Zhiguo Wang who used the term 'single agent–multiple targets' (SAMT) to describe the same principle as 'magic shotguns' and his research team provided the first experimental evidence for the feasibility, effectiveness and advantages of SAMT, specifically the 'complex decoy oligodeoxynucleotides technology cdODN' attacking multiple target transcription factors, in the treatment of xenograft breast cancer in mice. Subsequently, Wang's team extended the SAMT to designing single agent that can act on multiple miRNAs targeting cancer cells and cardiac pacemaker channel genes and calcium channel genes as a new therapeutic approach. Wang has published two monographs on polypharmacology:<Polypharmacology: Principles and Methodologies> and <Anti-Aging Polypharmacology> Wang's work is now categorized as 'Epigenetic Polypharmacology' or 'Targeted Polypharmacology', a branch of Polypharmacology. In 2008, Professor Keven Shokat and his colleagues described a single compound that blocks the proliferation of tumor cells by direct inhibition of oncogenic tyrosine kinases and phosphatidylinositol-3-OH kinases and termed it 'multitargeted drug' along with the concept of 'Polypharmacology'. Since then, Polypharmacology has become a new branch of Pharmacology discipline and research field as well as one of the new direction and strategies for drug development.

== See also ==
- Chemoproteomics
