= Trypsinization =

Chemical process of cell dissociation by using trypsin

Trypsinization is the process of cell dissociation using trypsin, a proteolytic enzyme which breaks down proteins, to dissociate adherent cells from the vessel in which they are being cultured. When added to cell culture, trypsin breaks down the proteins that enable the cells to adhere to the vessel. Trypsinization is often used to pass cells to a new vessel. When the trypsinization process is complete the cells will be in suspension and appear rounded.

For experimental purposes, cells are often cultivated in containers that take the form of plastic flasks or plates. In such flasks, cells are provided with a growth medium comprising the essential nutrients required for proliferation, and the cells adhere to the container and each other as they grow.

This process of cell culture or tissue culture requires a method to dissociate the cells from the container and each other. Trypsin, an enzyme commonly found in the digestive tract, can be used to "digest" the proteins that facilitate adhesion to the container and between cells.

Once cells have detached from their container it is necessary to deactivate the trypsin, unless the trypsin is synthetic, as cell surface proteins will also be cleaved over time and this will affect cell functioning. Serum can be used to inactivate trypsin, as it contains protease inhibitors. Because of the presence of these inhibitors, the serum must be removed before treatment of a growth vessel with trypsin and must not be added again to the growth vessel until cells have detached from their growth surface - this detachment can be confirmed by visual observation using a microscope.

Trypsinization is often used to permit passage of adherent cells to a new container, observation for experimentation, or reduction of the degree of confluency in a culture flask through the removal of a percentage of the cells.
