= Physiological condition =

Naturally-occurring phenomena for organisms

Physiological condition or, more often "physiological conditions" is a term used in biology, biochemistry, and medicine. It refers to conditions of the external or internal milieu that may occur in nature for that organism or cell system, in contrast to artificial laboratory conditions. A temperature range of 20-40 degrees Celsius, atmospheric pressure of 1, pH of 6-8, glucose concentration of 1-20 mM, atmospheric oxygen concentration, earth gravity and electromagnetism are examples of physiological conditions for most earth organisms.
