= Derivatization =

Chemistry technique

Derivatization is a technique used in chemistry which converts a chemical compound into a product (the reaction's derivate) of similar chemical structure, called a derivative.

Generally, a specific functional group of the compound participates in the derivatization reaction and transforms the educt to a derivate of deviating reactivity, solubility, boiling point, melting point, aggregate state, or chemical composition. Resulting new chemical properties can be used for quantification or separation of the educt.

Derivatization techniques are frequently employed in chemical analysis of mixtures and in surface analysis, e.g. in X-ray photoelectron spectroscopy where newly incorporated atoms label characteristic groups.

== Derivatization reactions ==
Several characteristics are desirable for a derivatization reaction:

1. The reaction is reliable and proceeds to completion. Less unreacted starting material will simplify analysis. Also, this allows a small amount of analyte to be used.
2. The reaction is general, allowing a wide range of substrates, yet specific to a single functional group, reducing complicating interference.
3. The products are relatively stable, and form no degradation products within a reasonable period, facilitating analysis.

Some examples of good derivatization reactions are the formation of esters and amides via acyl chlorides.

== Classical qualitative organic analysis ==
Classical qualitative organic analysis usually involves reacting an unknown sample with various reagents; a positive test usually involves a change in appearance — color, precipitation, etc.

These tests may be extended to give sub-gram scale products. These products may be purified by recrystallization, and their melting points taken. An example is the formation of 2,4-dinitrophenylhydrazones from ketones and 2,4-dinitrophenylhydrazine.

By consulting an appropriate reference table such as in Vogel's, the identity of the starting material may be deduced. The use of derivatives has traditionally been used to determine or confirm the identity of an unknown substance. However, due to the wide range of chemical compounds now known, it is unrealistic for these tables to be exhaustive. Modern spectroscopic and spectrometric techniques have made this technique obsolete for all but pedagogical purposes.

== For gas chromatography ==
Polar N-H and O-H groups on which give hydrogen bonding may be converted to relatively nonpolar groups on a relatively nonvolatile compound. The resultant product may be less polar, thus more volatile, allowing analysis by gas chromatography. Bulky, nonpolar silyl groups are often used for this purpose.

== Chiral derivatizing agent ==
Chiral derivatizing agents react with enantiomers to give diastereomers. Since diastereomers have different physical properties, they may be further analyzed by HPLC and NMR spectroscopy.
