= TRIP13 =

Protein-coding gene in the species Homo sapiens

Identifiers
- Aliases: TRIP13, 16E1BP, thyroid hormone receptor interactor 13, MVA3, OOMD9
- External IDs: OMIM: 604507; MGI: 1916966; GeneCards: TRIP13

Gene location (Human)
Chr.	Chromosome 5 (human)
Band	5p15.33	Start	892,884 bp
Band	5p15.33	End	919,357 bp

Gene location (Mouse)
Chr.	Chromosome 13 (mouse)
Band	13 C1|13 40.15 cM	Start	74,059,466 bp
Band	13 C1|13 40.15 cM	End	74,085,903 bp
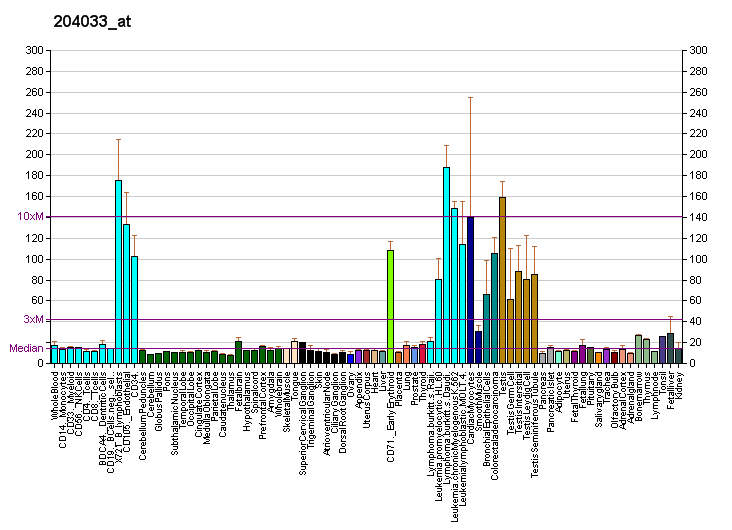
RNA expression pattern
Bgee	Human / Mouse (ortholog); Top expressed in: bronchial epithelial cell; oocyte; gonad; secondary oocyte; right testis; left testis; ventricular zone; mucosa of paranasal sinus; sperm; testicle / Top expressed in: otic placode; primitive streak; abdominal wall; endothelial cell of lymphatic vessel; Paneth cell; endocardial cushion; saccule; condyle; somite; otic vesicle; More reference expression data
BioGPS	More reference expression data
Gene ontology
Molecular function	nucleotide binding; protein binding; transcription coregulator activity; ATP binding; identical protein binding
Cellular component	male germ cell nucleus; nucleus; chromosome
Biological process	meiosis; reciprocal meiotic recombination; male meiosis I; cell differentiation; oocyte maturation; double-strand break repair; transcription by RNA polymerase II; synaptonemal complex assembly; spermatogenesis; female meiosis I; spermatid development; oogenesis; mitotic spindle assembly checkpoint signaling; regulation of nucleic acid-templated transcription; meiotic recombination checkpoint signaling
Sources:Amigo / QuickGO
Orthologs
Databases	NCBI: entry; OMA: entry
Species	Human	Mouse
Entrez	9319	69716
Ensembl	ENSG00000071539	ENSMUSG00000021569
UniProt	Q15645	Q3UA06
RefSeq (mRNA)	NM_001166260; NM_004237	NM_027182
RefSeq (protein)	NP_001159732; NP_004228	NP_081458
Location (UCSC)	Chr 5: 0.89 – 0.92 Mb	Chr 13: 74.06 – 74.09 Mb
PubMed search
- Wikidata
View/Edit Human	View/Edit Mouse

TRIP13 is a mammalian gene that encodes the thyroid receptor-interacting protein 13. In budding yeast, the analog for TRIP13 is PCH2. TRIP13 is a member of the AAA+ ATPase family, a family known for mechanical forces derived from ATP hydrolase reactions. The TRIP13 gene has been shown to interact with a variety of proteins and implicated in a few diseases, notably interacting with the ligand binding domain of thyroid hormone receptors, and may play a role in early-stage non-small cell lung cancer. However, recent evidence implicates TRIP13 in various cell cycle phases, including meiosis G2/Prophase and during the Spindle Assembly checkpoint (SAC). Evidence shows regulation to occur through the HORMA domains, including Hop1, Rev7, and Mad2. Of note, Mad2's involvement in the SAC is shown to be affected by TRIP13 Due to TRIP13's role in cell cycle arrest and progression, it may present opportunity as a therapeutic candidate for cancers.

== Structure ==
As an AAA+ ATPase, TRIP13 (and its PCH2 analog) forms homohexamers and interacts with ATP as an energy source. With respect to Hop1, PCH2 binds to and structurally changes Hop1, displacing the Hop1 from DNA. TRIP13/PCH2 interacts with ATP as a hydrolase, hydrolyzing phosphates to derive energy for conformational changes that can induce mechanical force on its substrate, Hop1 in the previous case. TRIP14/PCH2 is believed to have a single AAA+ ATPase domain. TRIP13/PCH2 also functions as a kinetochore protein that interacts with the silencing protein p31-Comet.

== Role in meiosis G2/prophase ==
Meiosis in mammalian cells have a series of checkpoints and steps that need to be properly regulated. TRIP13/PCH2 has been implicated in these processes in budding yeast as well, particularly in the meiosis G2/prophase stage. Double stranded breaks during meiosis is a key part of this phase and is impacted by TRIP13. The homologous recombination that occurs following these breaks requires a protein complex to influence and structure appropriate chromosomal pairing.

In a paper by San-Segundo et al., localization assays and induced mutations in PCH2 in budding yeast was shown to be required for the meiotic checkpoint to prevent chromosome segregation when the recombination or chromosome synapsis are defective. TRIP13, PCH2's analog, was also shown to be required for the formation of the synaptonemal complex – the complex that structures chromosomal pairings. Without TRIP13, meiocytes had pericentric synaptic forks, fewer crossovers, and altered distribution of chiasma (the contact point between homologous chromosomes. For this synaptonemal complex (SC) formation, meiotic HORMADS need to be removed. For example, PCH2 was found to be needed to remove Hop1 from chromosomes during SC formation. Other HORMADs, such as HORMAD1 and HORMAD2, are also depleted from the chromosomal pairs with the help of TRIP13 in mice cells. Research shows a robust and varied role for TRIP13/PCH2 to remove various proteins for SC formation, thus allowing meiosis to continue. Further mechanistic evidence is needed to clarify other proteins affected by TRIP13 in meiosis G2/Prophase, and elucidate the wide ability to affect a multitude of proteins.

== Role in spindle assembly checkpoint ==
Like its role in meiosis, TRIP13/PCH2 is also implicated in mitosis, particularly in the metaphase-to-anaphase transition and the Spindle Assembly Checkpoint (SAC). Its function also has impacts on the Anaphase Promoting Complex (APC). To continue from metaphase to anaphase, the cell must ensure chromosomes are bioriented and properly structured in order for correct and error-free separation of sister chromatids. This process requires many proteins to ensure dynamic timing and consistent response. In order for progression, the APC must be activated, which upon activation degrade securing. The APC is activated by CDC20, a protein that is silenced by the mitotic checkpoint complex (MCC). Of interest in relation to TRIP13 is Mad2, which has two forms (open O-Mad2 and closed C-Mad2) (2). When kinetochores are unattached, O-Mad2 converts to C-Mad2, which is then able to latch to CDC20, and essentially sequester it preventing mitotic progression.

Progression requires the disassembly of the MCC, which is found to be mediated by p31-Comet. This is through to occur in part by structural mimicry, where p31-Comet is structurally similar to C-Mad2. However, this process requires ATP, which is where TRIP13/PCH2 comes into play. Evidence shows that TRIP13/PCH2 uses p31-Comet as an adaptor protein to convert C-Mad2 into O-Mad2. However, the connection between TRIP13/PCH2 and the SAC is more nuanced. Experiments in human HeLa and HCT116 cells show that neither p31-Comet nor TRIP13 was particularly required for unperturbed mitosis, and that depleting P31-Comet only slightly impaired Mad2 inactivation. Additionally, research shows that without TRIP13, Mad2 exists exclusively in the closed form. Interestingly, in TRIP13 deficient cells, the SAC was unable to be inactivated and had a relatively short mitosis. This hints at the possibility that activation of the SAC and the formation of the MCC requires not only C-Mad2 but also the conversion of C-Mad2 to O-Mad2.

== Implications in cancer ==
Given TRIP13/PCH2's role in the correct biorientation of chromosomes during mitosis, it is unsurprising that it is connected to several cancers. In one instance, overexpression of TRIP13 has been shown to affect treatment resistance for Squamous cell carcinoma of the head and neck. Additionally, TRIP13 and Mad2 overexpression are correlated jointly in cancer. In relation to mitotic delays associated with Mad2 overexpression, overexpression of TRIP13 reduced and TRIP13 reduction increased the mitotic delay that Mad2 overexpression brings about. Furthermore, Mad2 over-expression and TRIP13 decrease inhibited proliferation in cells and tumor xenografts – presenting therapeutic value for TRIP13 reduction.
