= Protein precipitation =

Biochemical laboratory technique

Protein precipitation is widely used in downstream processing of biological products in order to concentrate proteins and purify them from various contaminants. For example, in the biotechnology industry protein precipitation is used to eliminate contaminants commonly contained in blood. The underlying mechanism of precipitation is to alter the solvation potential of the solvent, more specifically, by lowering the solubility of the solute by addition of a reagent.

== General principles ==
The solubility of proteins in aqueous buffers depends on the distribution of hydrophilic and hydrophobic amino acid residues on the protein's surface. Hydrophobic residues predominantly occur in the globular protein core, but some exist in patches on the surface. Proteins that have high hydrophobic amino acid content on the surface have low solubility in an aqueous solvent. Charged and polar surface residues interact with ionic groups in the solvent and increase the solubility of a protein. Knowledge of a protein's amino acid composition will aid in determining an ideal precipitation solvent and methods.

=== Repulsive electrostatic force ===
Repulsive electrostatic forces form when proteins are dissolved in an electrolyte solution. These repulsive forces between proteins prevent aggregation and facilitate dissolution. Upon dissolution in an electrolyte solution, solvent counterions migrate towards charged surface residues on the protein, forming a rigid matrix of counterions on the protein's surface. Next to this layer is another solvation layer that is less rigid and, as one moves away from the protein surface, contains a decreasing concentration of counterions and an increasing concentration of co-ions. The presence of these solvation layers cause the protein to have fewer ionic interactions with other proteins and decreases the likelihood of aggregation. Repulsive electrostatic forces also form when proteins are dissolved in water. Water forms a solvation layer around the hydrophilic surface residues of a protein. Water establishes a concentration gradient around the protein, with the highest concentration at the protein surface. This water network has a damping effect on the attractive forces between proteins.

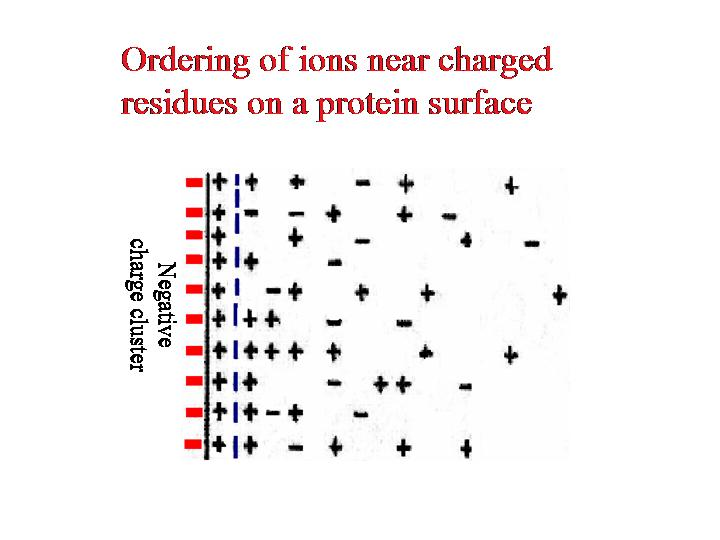
Ionic solvation layer

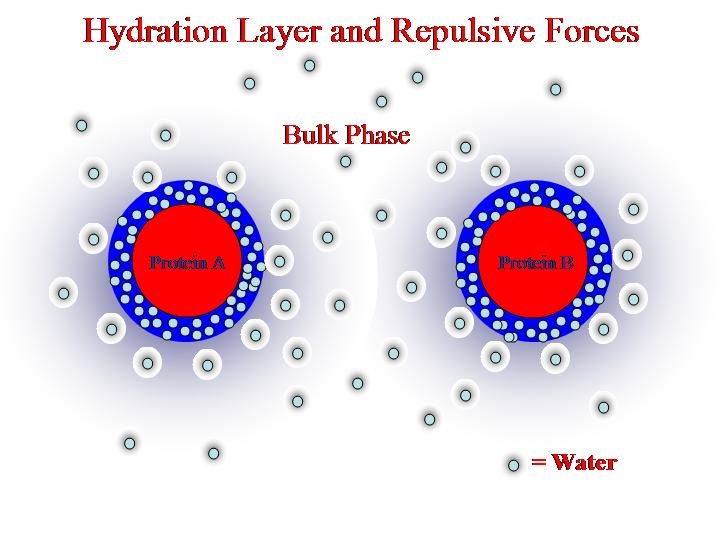
Hydration layer

=== Attractive electrostatic force ===
Dispersive or attractive forces exist between proteins through permanent and induced dipoles. For example, basic residues on a protein can have electrostatic interactions with acidic residues on another protein. However, solvation by ions in an electrolytic solution or water will decrease protein–protein attractive forces. Therefore, to precipitate or induce accumulation of proteins, the hydration layer around the protein should be reduced. The purpose of the added reagents in protein precipitation is to reduce the hydration layer.

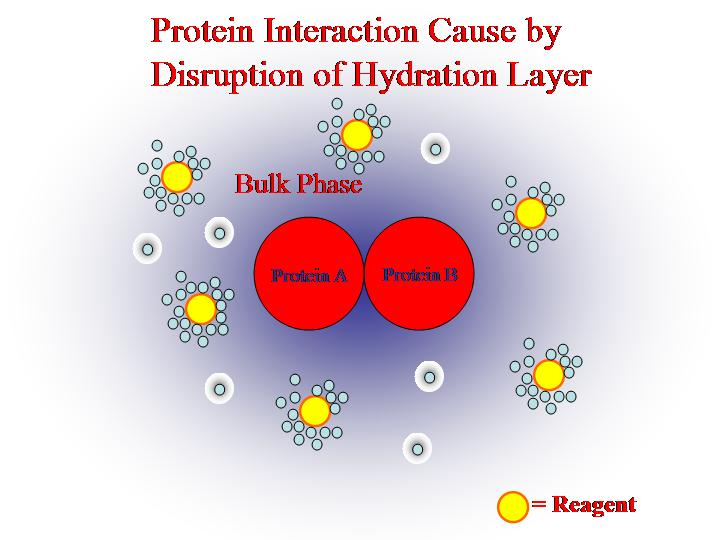
Hydration layer

=== Precipitate formation ===
Protein precipitate formation occurs in a stepwise process. First, a precipitating agent is added and the solution is steadily mixed. Mixing causes the precipitant and protein to collide. Enough mixing time is required for molecules to diffuse across the fluid eddies. Next, proteins undergo a nucleation phase, where submicroscopic sized protein aggregates, or particles, are generated. Growth of these particles is under Brownian diffusion control. Once the particles reach a critical size (0.1 μm to 10 μm for high and low shear fields, respectively), by diffusive addition of individual protein molecules to it, they continue to grow by colliding into each other and sticking or flocculating. This phase occurs at a slower rate. During the final step, called aging in a shear field, the precipitate particles repeatedly collide and stick, then break apart, until a stable mean particle size is reached, which is dependent upon individual proteins. The mechanical strength of the protein particles correlates with the product of the mean shear rate and the aging time, which is known as the Camp number. Aging helps particles withstand the fluid shear forces encountered in pumps and centrifuge feed zones without reducing in size.

== Methods ==
=== Salting out ===
Salting out is the most common method used to precipitate a protein. Addition of a neutral salt, such as ammonium sulfate, compresses the solvation layer and increases protein–protein interactions. As the salt concentration of a solution is increased, the charges on the surface of the protein interact with the salt, not the water, thereby exposing hydrophobic patches on the protein surface and causing the protein to fall out of solution (aggregate and precipitate).

==== Energetics involved in salting out ====
Salting out is a spontaneous process when the right concentration of the salt is reached in solution. The hydrophobic patches on the protein surface generate highly ordered water shells. This results in a small decrease in enthalpy, ΔH, and a larger decrease in entropy, ΔS, of the ordered water molecules relative to the molecules in the bulk solution. The overall free energy change, ΔG, of the process is given by the Gibbs free energy equation:

$$\Delta G = \Delta H - T \Delta S.$$

ΔG = Free energy change, ΔH = Enthalpy change upon precipitation, ΔS = Entropy change upon precipitation, T = Absolute temperature. When water molecules in the rigid solvation layer are brought back into the bulk phase through interactions with the added salt, their greater freedom of movement causes a significant increase in their entropy. Thus, ΔG becomes negative and precipitation occurs spontaneously.

==== Hofmeister series ====
Kosmotropes or "water structure stabilizers" are salts which promote the dissipation / dispersion of water from the solvation layer around a protein. Hydrophobic patches are then exposed on the protein's surface, and they interact with hydrophobic patches on other proteins. These salts enhance protein aggregation and precipitation. Chaotropes or "water structure breakers," have the opposite effect of Kosmotropes. These salts promote an increase in the solvation layer around a protein. The effectiveness of the kosmotropic salts in precipitating proteins follows the order of the Hofmeister series:

Most precipitation $\mathrm{ PO_{4}^{3-} > SO_{4}^{2-} > COO^{-} > Cl^{-}}$ least precipitation

Most precipitation $\mathrm{ NH_{4}^{+} > K^{+} > Na^{+}}$ least precipitation

==== Salting out in practice ====
The decrease in protein solubility follows a normalized solubility curve of the type shown. The relationship between the solubility of a protein and increasing ionic strength of the solution can be represented by the Cohn equation:

$$\log S = B - KI \,$$

S = solubility of the protein, B is idealized solubility, K is a salt-specific constant and I is the ionic strength of the solution, which is attributed to the added salt.

$$I = \begin{matrix}\frac{1}{2}\end{matrix}\sum_{i=1}^{n} c_{i}z_{i}^{2}$$

z_{i} is the ion charge of the salt and c_{i} is the salt concentration. The ideal salt for protein precipitation is most effective for a particular amino acid composition, inexpensive, non-buffering, and non-polluting. The most commonly used salt is ammonium sulfate. There is a low variation in salting out over temperatures 0 °C to 30 °C. Protein precipitates left in the salt solution can remain stable for years-protected from proteolysis and bacterial contamination by the high salt concentrations.

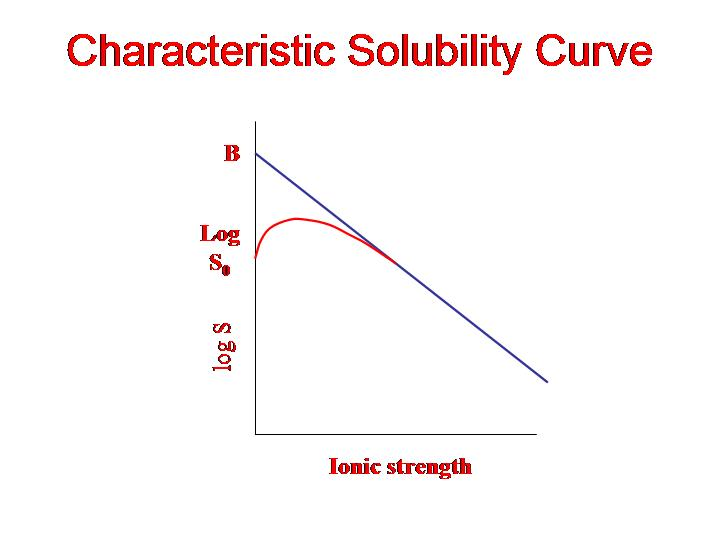
Solubility curve

=== Isoelectric precipitation ===
The isoelectric point (pI) is the pH of a solution at which the net primary charge of a protein becomes zero. At a solution pH that is above the pI the surface of the protein is predominantly negatively charged and therefore like-charged molecules will exhibit repulsive forces. Likewise, at a solution pH that is below the pI, the surface of the protein is predominantly positively charged and repulsion between proteins occurs. However, at the pI the negative and positive charges cancel, repulsive electrostatic forces are reduced and the attraction forces predominate. The attraction forces will cause aggregation and precipitation. The pI of most proteins is in the pH range of 4–6. Mineral acids, such as hydrochloric and sulfuric acid are used as precipitants. The greatest disadvantage to isoelectric point precipitation is the irreversible denaturation caused by the mineral acids. For this reason isoelectric point precipitation is most often used to precipitate contaminant proteins, rather than the target protein. The precipitation of casein during cheesemaking, or during production of sodium caseinate, is an isoelectric precipitation.

=== Precipitation with miscible solvents ===
Addition of miscible solvents such as ethanol or methanol to a solution may cause proteins in the solution to precipitate. The solvation layer around the protein will decrease as the organic solvent progressively displaces water from the protein surface and binds it in hydration layers around the organic solvent molecules. With smaller hydration layers, the proteins can aggregate by attractive electrostatic and dipole forces. Important parameters to consider are temperature, which should be less than 0 °C to avoid denaturation, pH and protein concentration in solution. Miscible organic solvents decrease the dielectric constant of water, which in effect allows two proteins to come close together. At the isoelectric point the relationship between the dielectric constant and protein solubility is given by:

$$\log S = k/e^{2} + \log S^{0} \,$$

S^{0} is an extrapolated value of S, e is the dielectric constant of the mixture and k is a constant that relates to the dielectric constant of water. The Cohn process for plasma protein fractionation relies on solvent precipitation with ethanol to isolate individual plasma proteins.

a clinical application for the use of methanol as a protein precipitating agent is in the estimation of bilirubin.

=== Non-ionic hydrophilic polymers ===
Polymers, such as dextrans and polyethylene glycols, are frequently used to precipitate proteins because they have low flammability and are less likely to denature biomaterials than isoelectric precipitation. These polymers in solution attract water molecules away from the solvation layer around the protein. This increases the protein–protein interactions and enhances precipitation. For the specific case of polyethylene glycol, precipitation can be modeled by the equation:

$$\ln(S) + pS = X - aC \,$$

C is the polymer concentration, P is a protein–protein interaction coefficient, a is a protein–polymer interaction coefficient and

$$x = (\mu_i - \mu_i^{0})RT$$

μ is the chemical potential of component I, R is the universal gas constant and T is the absolute temperature.

=== Flocculation by polyelectrolytes ===
Alginate, carboxymethylcellulose, polyacrylic acid, tannic acid and polyphosphates can form extended networks between protein molecules in solution. The effectiveness of these polyelectrolytes depend on the pH of the solution. Anionic polyelectrolytes are used at pH values less than the isoelectric point. Cationic polyelectrolytes are at pH values above the pI. An excess of polyelectrolytes will cause the precipitate to dissolve back into the solution. An example of polyelectrolyte flocculation is the removal of protein cloud from beer wort using Irish moss.

=== Polyvalent metallic ions ===
Metal salts can be used at low concentrations to precipitate enzymes and nucleic acids from solutions. Polyvalent metal ions frequently used are Ca^{2+}, Mg^{2+}, Mn^{2+} or Fe^{2+}.

== Precipitation reactors ==
There are numerous industrial scaled reactors than can be used to precipitate large amounts of proteins, such as recombinant DNA polymerases from a solution.

=== Batch reactors ===
Batch reactors are the simplest type of precipitation reactor. The precipitating agent is slowly added to the protein solution under mixing. The aggregating protein particles tend to be compact and regular in shape. Since the particles are exposed to a wide range of shear stresses for a long period of time, they tend to be compact, dense and mechanically stable.

=== Tubular reactors ===
In tubular reactors, feed protein solution and the precipitating reagent are contacted in a zone of efficient mixing then fed into long tubes where precipitation takes place. The fluid in volume elements approach plug flow as they move though the tubes of the reactor. Turbulent flow is promoted through wire mesh inserts in the tube. The tubular reactor does not require moving mechanical parts and is inexpensive to build. However, the reactor can become impractically long if the particles aggregate slowly.

=== Continuous stirred tank reactors (CSTR) ===
CSTR reactors run at steady state with a continuous flow of reactants and products in a well-mixed tank. Fresh protein feed contacts slurry that already contains precipitate particles and the precipitation reagents.
