= Epigenetic therapy =

Use of epigenome-influencing techniques to treat medical conditions

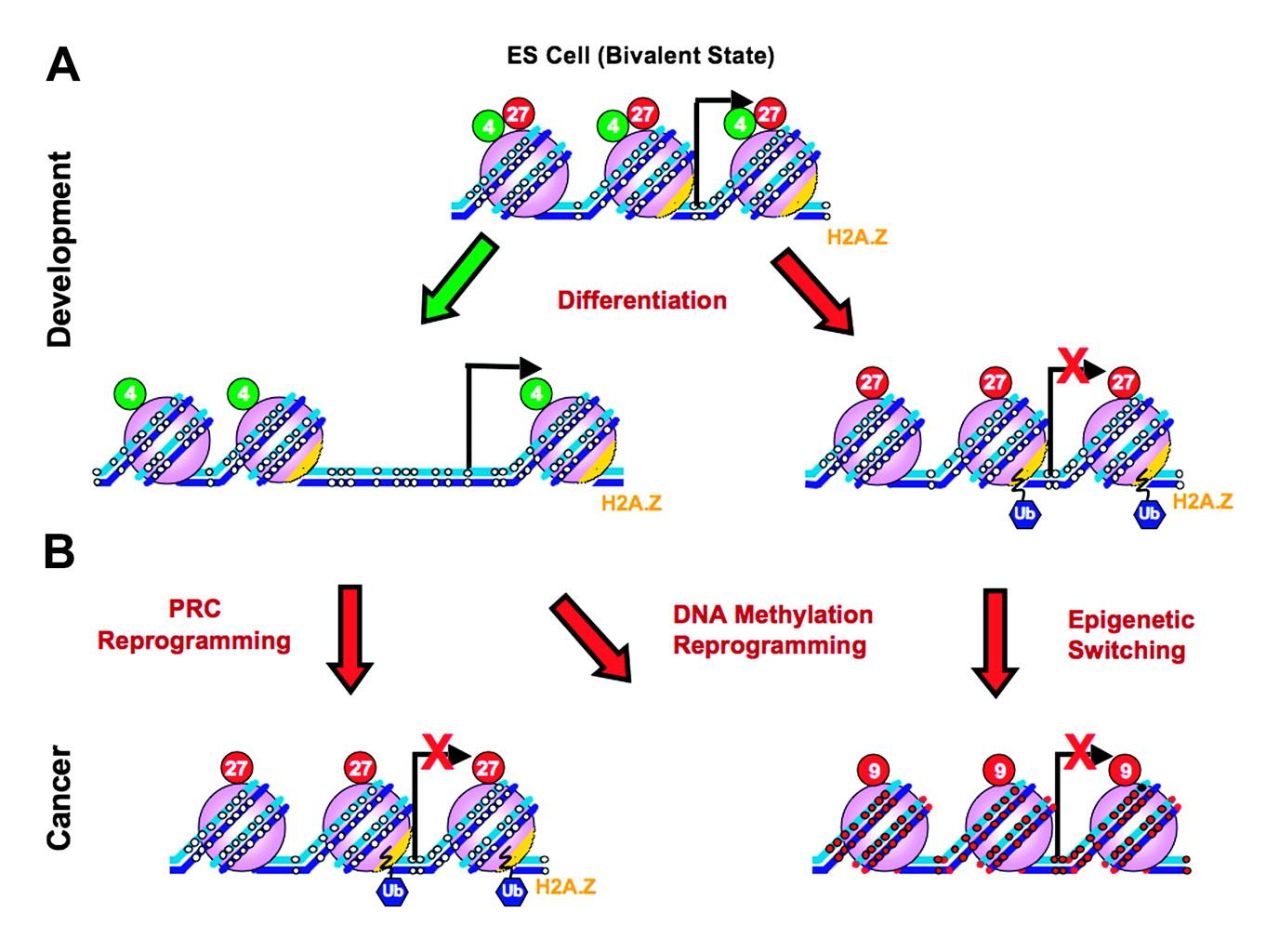
A diagram of epigenetic therapy

Epigenetic therapy refers to the use of drugs or other interventions to modify gene expression patterns, potentially treating diseases by targeting epigenetic mechanisms such as DNA methylation and histone modifications.

Epigenetics is the study of changes in gene expression that do not arise from alterations in the DNA sequence, resulting in the heritable silencing of genes without changing the coding sequence. Epigenetic therapy involves using drugs or other techniques to influence these epigenetic mechanisms in addressing specific medical conditions. Various diseases, such as diabetes, cancer, heart disease, and mental illnesses, are influenced by epigenetic mechanisms. Emerging areas of epigenetic therapy include its application in heart disease, primarily focusing on tissue regeneration, and in schizophrenia, where the focus lies on alleviating symptoms. Overall, epigenetic therapies aim to target the underlying epigenetic molecular pathways responsible for disease manifestation.

== Epigenetics ==
Epigenetics refers to the study of changes in gene expressions that do not result from alterations in the DNA sequence'. Altered gene expression patterns can result from chemical modifications in DNA and chromatin, to changes in several regulatory mechanisms. Epigenetic markings can be inherited in some cases, and can change in response to environmental stimuli over the course of an organism's life.

Many diseases are known to have a genetic component, but the epigenetic mechanisms underlying many conditions are still being discovered. A significant number of diseases are known to change the expression of genes within the body, and epigenetic involvement is a plausible hypothesis for how they do this. These changes can be the cause of symptoms to the disease. Several diseases, especially cancer, have been suspected of selectively turning genes on or off, thereby resulting in a capability for the tumorous tissues to escape the host's immune reaction.

Known epigenetic mechanisms typically cluster into three categories. The first is DNA methylation, where a cytosine residue that is followed by a guanine residue (CpG) is methylated. In general, DNA methylation attracts proteins which fold that section of the chromatin and repress the related genes. The second category is histone modifications. Histones are proteins which are involved in the folding and compaction of the chromatin. There are several different types of histones, and they can be chemically modified in a number of ways. Acetylation of histone tails typically leads to weaker interactions between the histones and the DNA, which is associated with gene expression. Histones can be modified in many positions, with many different types of chemical modifications, but the precise details of the histone code are currently unknown. The final category of epigenetic mechanism is regulatory RNA. MicroRNAs are small, noncoding sequences that are involved in gene expression. Thousands of miRNAs are known, and the extent of their involvement in epigenetic regulation is an area of ongoing research. Epigenetic therapies are reversible, unlike gene therapy. This means that they are druggable for targeted therapies.

== Potential applications ==
=== Cancer ===
Epigenetic alterations can play a major role in the development and progression of cancer. This can be seen as a result of the changes made by various epigenetic mechanisms (i.e. DNA methylation, histone modification, non-coding RNAs) which may work to silence or activate cancer-related genes (i.e. tumor-suppressor genes or oncogenes), therefore invoking changes in gene expression patterns that are responsible for the initiation, progression, and metastasis of cancer. One example includes DNA hypermethylation of tumor-suppressor genes which can cause transcriptional inactivation of genes (i.e. CDKN2A) encoding for other regulatory proteins (i.e. p14 and p16) that play a vital role in the cell cycle. However, there are numerous avenues in which cancer can arise epigenetically given the various hallmarks of cancer. Because of this, epigenetic drugs are utilized to target and combat the internal dysregulation caused by these epigenetic alterations.

DNA methyltransferase inhibitors (DNMTis) are used as a treatment option against various forms of cancer. Some of these drugs, including 5-azacytidine, Decitabine, and Zebularine, have been shown to reactivate the cellular anti-tumor systems repressed by cancer, enabling the body to weaken and kill off the tumor. This can specifically result due to DNMTis ability to block overly active DNMTs, resulting in the hypomethylation of CpG regions which can allow for normal cell growth. Other treatment options including histone deacetylase inhibitors (HDACis), such as vorinostat, have also shown promising epigenetic therapeutic effects through the reactivation of apoptosis, cell death of undesirable cells, and the inhibition of angiogenesis, the formation of new blood vessels that can be utilized by cancerous cells as an extra source of nutrients. HDACis are an example of a chromatin-modifying drug, which specifically targets the acetylation portion of cancerous cells, and like DMNTis, is able to reactivate the cellular anti-tumor systems within a cell. Now because of their wide-ranging effects throughout the entire body, many of these drugs may have major side effects, making dosage regulation important; however, the survival rates are increased significantly when they are used for treatment, whether independently or in congruence with chemotherapy or other cancer-related forms of medication.

Phytochemical interventions have also gained traction in serving as an epigenetic treatment option against cancer. Phytochemicals, which are compounds produced by plants that act as a protectant to aid in their survival, can have an impact on the function of DNMTs. Polyphenols, a type of phytochemical that can be found in everyday foods and ingredients like tea, apples, and various forms of berries, have been shown to have anticancer effects. For example, epigallocatechin gallate (EGCG), the most prevalent polyphenol found in green tea, can work to inhibit cell proliferation by inducing apoptosis, preventing angiogenesis, and disrupting regulatory pathways, such as MAPK pathways.

Although various mechanisms have been utilized to mitigate the negative effects of cancer development and progression, drug resistance does still occur. Drug resistance can emerge as a result of continued and repetitive usage of a drug, giving pathogens time to develop defenses against drugs designed to kill them. In cancer, overexpression, for instance in DNA methylation and histone deactylase, can cause deleterious effects which can enhance drug resistance behaviors such as drug efflux. Drug efflux is regulatory process in which toxic compounds (i.e. drugs for cancer) get removed from a cell to reduce its cytotoxic effects. However, research suggests there are ways to overcome this type of drug resistance, with one being through the use of epigenetic factor inhibitors.

=== Cardiovascular disease ===
Cardiovascular disease is one of the leading cause of death. Factors such as age, smoking, obesity, diabetes, and hypertension increase the likelihood of developing cardiovascular diseases. As of now, initial investigations have established links between DNA methylation, histone modifications, RNA-based mechanisms, and the onset of cardiovascular diseases such as atherosclerosis, cardiac hypertrophy, myocardial infarction, and heart failure. Epigenetic alterations like DNA methylation enzymes can reverse abnormal DNA methylation, histone modifications, and non-coding RNA regulation play critical roles in cardiovascular disease. A number of cardiac dysfunctions have been linked to cytosine methylation patterns. DNA methylation is an important epigenetic mechanism, it is able to transfer to offspring DNA through the regulation of DNMT. DNA demethylation can happen through either an active or passive process. Passive demethylation refers to the failure of maintenance DNA methyltransferases (DNMTs) to methylate the newly synthesized DNA strand during mitosis. DNMT deficient mice show upregulation of inflammatory mediators, which cause increased atherosclerosis and inflammation. Atherosclerotic tissue has increased methylation in the promoter region for the estrogen gene, although any connection between the two is unknown. Hypermethylation of the HSD11B2 gene, which catalyzes conversions between cortisone and cortisol, and is therefore influential in the stress response in mammals, has been correlated with hypertension. Decreased LINE-1 methylation is a strong predictive indicator of ischemic heart disease and stroke, although the mechanism is unknown. Various impairments in lipid metabolism, leading to clogging of arteries, has been associated with the hypermethylation of GNASAS, IL-10, MEG3, ABCA1, and the hypomethylation of INSIGF and IGF2. Additionally, upregulation of a number of miRNAs has been shown to be associated with acute myocardial infarction, coronary artery disease, and heart failure. Strong research efforts into this area are very recent, with all of the aforementioned discoveries being made since 2009. Mechanisms are entirely speculative at this point, and an area of future research. It has been demonstrated that miRNAs regulate gene expression by suppressing messenger RNA (mRNA) translation and increasing mRNA degradation. Studies have shown that miRNAs can influence myocardial angiogenesis and the survival and proliferation of cardiomyocytes by regulating target gene expression.

Epigenetic treatment methods for cardiac dysfunction are still highly speculative. SiRNA therapy targeting the miRNAs mentioned above is being investigated. The primary area of research in this field is on using epigenetic methods to increase the regeneration of cardiac tissues damaged by various diseases. By comprehending the roles these mechanisms play in disease pathology, researchers can devise precise treatments to regulate gene expression, potentially halting or alleviating the progression of cardiovascular diseases.

=== Diabetic retinopathy ===
Diabetes is a disease where an affected individual is unable to convert food into energy. When left untreated, the condition can lead to other, more severe complications. A common sign of diabetes is the degradation of blood vessels in various tissues throughout the body. Retinopathy refers to damage from this process in the retina, the part of the eye that senses light. Diabetic retinopathy is known to be associated with a number of epigenetic markers, including methylation of the Sod2 and MMP-9 genes, an increase in transcription of LSD1, a H3K4 and H3K9 demethylase, and various DNA Methyl-Transferases (DNMTs), and increased presence of miRNAs for transcription factors and VEGF.

It is believed that much of the retinal vascular degeneration characteristic of diabetic retinopathy is due to impaired mitochondrial activity in the retina. Sod2 codes for a superoxide disputes enzyme, which scavenges free radicals and prevents oxidative damage to cells. LSD1 may play a major role in diabetic retinopathy through the downregulation of Sod2 in retinal vascular tissue, leading to oxidative damage in those cells. MMP-9 is believed to be involved in cellular apoptosis, and is similarly downregulated, which may help to propagate the effects of diabetic retinopathy.

Several avenues to epigenetic treatment of diabetic retinopathy have been studied. One approach is to inhibit the methylation of the Sod2 and MMP-9. The DNMT inhibitors 5-azacytidine and 5-aza-20-deoxycytidine have both been approved by the FDA for the treatment of other conditions, and studies have examined the effects of those compounds on diabetic retinopathy, where they seem to inhibit these methylation patterns with some success at reducing symptoms. The DNA methylation inhibitor Zebularine has also been studied, although results are currently inconclusive. A second approach is to attempt to reduce the miRNAs observed at elevated levels in retinopathic patients, although the exact role of those miRNAs is still unclear. The Histone Acetyltransferase (HAT) inhibitors Epigallocatechin-3-gallate, Vorinostat, and Romidepsin have also been the subject of experimentation for this purpose, with some limited success. The possibility of using Small Interfering RNAs, or siRNAs, to target the miRNAs mentioned above has been discussed, but there are currently no known methods to do so. This method is somewhat hindered by the difficulty involved in delivering the siRNAs to the affected tissues.

Type 2 diabetes mellitus (T2DM) has many variations and factors that influence how it affects the body. DNA methylation is a process by which methyl groups attach to DNA structure causing the gene to not be expressed. This is thought to be an epigenetic cause of T2DM by causing the body to develop an insulin resistance and inhibit the production of beta cells in the pancreas. Because of the repressed genes the body does not regulate blood sugar transport to cells, causing a high concentration of glucose in the blood stream.

Another variation of T2DM is mitochondrial reactive oxygen species (ROS) which causes a lack of antioxidants in the blood. This leads to oxidation stress of cells leading to the release of free radicals inhibiting blood glucose regulation and hyperglycemic conditions. This leads to persistent vascular complications that can inhibit blood flow to limbs and the eyes. This persistent hyperglycemic environment leads to DNA methylation as well because the chemistry within chromatin in the nucleus is affected.

Current medicine used by T2DM sufferers includes Metformin hydrochloride which stimulates production in the pancreas and promotes insulin sensitivity. A number of preclinical studies have suggested that adding a treatment to metformin that would inhibit acetylation and methylation of DNA and histone complexes. DNA methylation occurs throughout the human genome and is believed to be a natural method of suppressing genes during development. Treatments targeting specific genes with methylation and acetylation inhibitors is being studied and debated.

=== Autism spectrum disorder ===
Autism or autism spectrum disorder (ASD) is a neurodevelopmental disorder discovered in 1943. It is part of a growing group of disorders called pervasive developmental disorders (PDDs), which are becoming increasingly common up to 1 in 110 in the United States and 1 in 64 in the United Kingdom.

While there are many causes for Autism spectrum disorder to manifest (viral infection, encephalitis, or an auto immune reaction, but the primary reasons are genetic or epigenetic. in the 1970s karyotyping allowed for the understanding of chromosomes, over time techniques such as fluorescence in situ hybridization (FISH)) we began to be able to analyze chromosomes with more resolution. Chromosome microarray and single nucleotide genotyping, and even whole genotype sequencing allow resolution at the gene level. One issue that possibly leads to autism is copy number variation in a gene the most studied of which is the 15q multiplication from the maternal chromosome. A database of genes (AutDB) has over 800 potential targets for study as a cause for autism. While not an exhaustive list a few examples are NLGN4X, PAH, PEX7, and SYNE1.

The heterogeneity of autism causes and symptoms has led to research in epigenetic factors. Maternal health during pregnancy, including taking folic acid, has been shown to affect the chances of not having ASD through epigenetic means. DNA methylation and histone modification are the two leading causes for epigenetic causes for autism. Targets for research for DNA methylation in relation to autism are oxytocin receptor, SHANK3, and BCL-2. Oxytocin is a hormone that partially controls social interactions, this has been epigenetically linked to autism. Methylation controls SHANK3 levels, which in turn activate CpG- island genes, which can lead to autism. BCL-2 is involved in cell death, and an event that misfires could contribute to brain development in that region. Histone modification also potentially leads to autism. Histone modification contributes to brain development. Modification of lysine residues on the H3 histone effect brain development. histone deacetylase inhibitors sodium butyrate and trichostatin A are regulators of oxytocin and vasopressin which are linked to autism symptoms.

Epigenetic therapies are a new emerging medical field. There are a number of potential therapies to treat ASD, using various methods. While the research into potential therapies is still in its infancy one of the positives of epigenetic therapy is it is reversible, this leads to many less potential side effects. While there are no current therapeutics approved for epigenetic use in autism there are a number of potential categories, histone deacetylase inhibitors (HDACis), and DNA methyltransferases. While there promising research and development for future methods of epigenetic therapy, there is currently no available drugs in clinical trials.

Histone acetlytion is a standard way to measure gene activity, HDACS remove histones thereby lowering the gene activity at that site. HDACi drugs are being tested and used as cancer theraputics, but are showing potential for neurodevelopmental disorders such as ASD. Valproic acid, commonly called Vorinostat, is an HDACi that helps with mood stabilization, this shows that it has potential for other neuro applications. MGCD0103 is a drug that is in preclinical trials as a cancer drug. Is mechanism is to affect HDAC1. HDAC1 has a large impact on many functions in the body, including many neuro regions, this makes it a good candidate for a potential Autism therapy.

DNA Methyltransferases (DNMT) have the potential to silence specific genes. As we learn more about genes related to ASD such as PAH (see above) these compounds become more relevant as therapies. There are three types of DNMT's. DNMT1 is a maintenance DNMT whereas DNMT3a and DNMT 3b are a de novo factor. There are currently two therapeutics being tested for this process, azacitidine and decitabine.

=== Fear, anxiety, and trauma ===
Traumatic experiences can lead to several mental illnesses including post-traumatic stress disorder. It was previously thought that PTSD could be treated with advances in cognitive behavioral therapy methods like Exposure therapy. In exposure therapy, patients are exposed to stimuli that provoke fear and anxiety. In theory, repeated exposure can lead to a decreased connection between the stimuli and the anxiety. While exposure therapy helps many patients, many patients do not experience improvement in their symptoms while others may experience more symptoms.

The biochemical mechanisms underlying these systems are not completely understood. However, brain-derived neurotrophic factor (BDNF) and the N-methyl-D-aspartate receptors (NMDA) have been identified as crucial in the exposure therapy process. Successful exposure therapy is associated with increased acetylation of these two genes. Acetylation is a biochemical modification that affects how tightly DNA is wound around histone proteins, thereby influencing gene expression. When the genes encoding BDNF and NMDA receptors experience increased acetylation, they become more "accessible" for transcription, the first step in protein production. So, enhanced expression of BDNF and NMDA receptors seems to bolster neural plasticity, facilitating the brain's capacity to form new connections and adjust its responses to anxiety-provoking stimuli. For these reasons, increasing the acetylation of these two genes has been a major area of recent research into the treatment of anxiety disorders.

N-methyl-D-aspartate receptors (NMDA receptors) play a crucial role in synaptic plasticity and learning, including fear extinction, which is a core mechanism targeted in exposure therapy. These receptors are involved in the consolidation of new memories and the extinction of fear responses by regulating the strength of synaptic connections. Exposure therapy aims to reduce the fear response to specific stimuli by repeated exposure to those stimuli in a safe environment. During exposure therapy, the process of fear extinction occurs, where individuals learn that the feared stimuli no longer predict harm. NMDA receptors are implicated in this fear extinction learning process through their involvement in synaptic plasticity mechanisms, such as long-term potentiation (LTP) and long-term depression (LTD), which underlie the formation and extinction of fear memories. Research has shown that pharmacological manipulation of NMDA receptors can influence fear extinction learning and enhance the efficacy of exposure therapy. For example, drugs that enhance NMDA receptor function, such as D-cycloserine, have been used as adjuncts to exposure therapy to facilitate fear extinction in individuals with anxiety disorders. The article "Effects of D-cycloserine on extinction: translation from preclinical to clinical work" (Davis et al., 2006) discusses the preclinical and clinical studies investigating the effects of D-cycloserine, a partial agonist at the glycine site of the NMDA receptor, on fear extinction and its translation to clinical applications in exposure therapy for anxiety disorders.

In relation to epigenetic therapy, modulating NMDA receptor-related pathways and enhancing fear extinction learning. By targeting epigenetic modifications of NMDA receptor genes, such as promoting DNA demethylation or histone acetylation, it may be possible to enhance NMDA receptor function and facilitate fear extinction processes. This could involve adjunctive treatments with epigenetic-modifying agents, tailored to individual genetic and epigenetic profiles, to optimize exposure therapy outcomes in individuals with anxiety disorders.

Going deeper into BDNF as well, utilizing BDNF as more than a mere marker in exposure therapy and integrating it into epigenetic therapy to target BDNF-related pathways could serve as a valuable addition to complement exposure therapy. The relationship between BDNF, exposure therapy, and epigenetic therapy can be illuminated by considering the role of BDNF in fear extinction learning, which is a core mechanism targeted in exposure therapy, and the potential for epigenetic mechanisms to modulate BDNF expression and function.

BDNF plays a pivotal role in fear extinction learning, crucial for exposure therapy, by facilitating synaptic plasticity and consolidating safety memories. Individuals with BDNF dysfunction, like those with the Val66Met SNP (The Val66Met single nucleotide polymorphism (SNP) of BDNF), may exhibit impaired fear extinction, potentially leading to treatment resistance in exposure therapy. Consequently, strategies aimed at enhancing BDNF function or expression could enhance the efficacy of exposure therapy interventions. Moreover, epigenetic mechanisms, such as DNA methylation and histone modifications, dynamically regulate BDNF expression and function. Environmental factors and genetic variants like the Val66Met SNP can influence BDNF epigenetic marks, impacting its transcriptional activity. Targeting epigenetic modifications of BDNF presents a novel approach to modulating fear extinction processes, potentially improving exposure therapy outcomes. Epigenetic therapy could complement exposure therapy by targeting BDNF-related pathways, such as demethylating the BDNF gene promoter or altering histone acetylation patterns to facilitate BDNF transcription. Integrating genetic information, such as BDNF polymorphisms, with epigenetic profiles and clinical data allows for personalized treatment approaches. Identifying individuals likely to benefit from targeted epigenetic interventions could enhance fear extinction learning and improve treatment outcomes in exposure therapy. This interplay between BDNF, exposure therapy, and epigenetic regulation holds promise for optimizing treatment outcomes and advancing personalized medicine approaches for anxiety disorders.

HDAC inhibitors are also a topic that can be discussed in this area. Exposure therapy's effectiveness in rodents is increased by the administration of Vorinostat, Entinostat, TSA, sodium butyrate, and VPA, all known histone deacetylase inhibitors. Several studies in the past two years have shown that in humans, Vorinostat and Entinostat increase the clinical effectiveness of exposure therapy as well, and human trials using the drugs successfully in rodents are planned. In addition to research on the effectiveness of HDAC inhibitors, some researchers have suggested that histone acetyltransferase activators might have a similar effect, although not enough research has been completed to draw any conclusions. However, none of these drugs are likely to be able to replace exposure therapy or other cognitive behavioral therapy methods. Rodent studies have indicated that administration of HDAC inhibitors without successful exposure therapy worsens anxiety disorders significantly, although the mechanism for this trend is unknown. The most likely explanation is that exposure therapy works by a learning process, and can be enhanced by processes that increase neural plasticity and learning. However, if a subject is exposed to a stimulus that causes anxiety in such a way that their fear does not decrease, compounds that increase learning may also increase re-consolidation, ultimately strengthening the memory.

Psychotherapy can be linked to alterations in epigenetic markers. An example of the growing evidence that indicates that successful psychotherapy can be linked to alterations in epigenetic markers, particularly DNA methylation, and could serve as a potential indicator of treatment efficacy is a research paper titled "Epigenetics of traumatic stress: The association of NR3C1 methylation and posttraumatic stress disorder symptom changes in response to narrative exposure therapy". This study explored the relationship between DNA methylation at the glucocorticoid receptor gene (NR3C1) and the success of psychotherapy in treating Posttraumatic Stress Disorder (PTSD) among conflict survivors in Northern Uganda. The researchers used Narrative Exposure Therapy (NET) on a sample of 153 individuals with PTSD and conducted diagnostic interviews and saliva sampling before treatment and at 4 and 10 months after treatment completion. They found that changes in methylation at a specific CpG site (cg25535999) were associated with PTSD symptom development. Treatment responders showed an increase in methylation at this site after therapy, while lower methylation levels before treatment predicted greater symptom improvement. These findings suggest that epigenetic changes at NR3C1 may play a role in the success of trauma-focused therapy, highlighting the importance of glucocorticoid signaling in PTSD treatment.

=== Schizophrenia ===
Research findings have demonstrated that schizophrenia is linked to numerous epigenetic alterations, including DNA methylation and histone modifications. For example, the therapeutic efficacy of schizophrenic drugs such as antipsychotics are limited by epigenetic alterations and future studies are looking into the related biochemical mechanisms to improve the efficacy of such therapies. Even if epigenetic therapy wouldn't allow to fully reverse the disease, it can significantly improve the quality of life.

== See also ==
- Pharmacoepigenetics
