= Pharmacoepigenetics =

Field of study

Pharmacoepigenetics is an emerging field that studies the underlying epigenetic marking patterns that lead to variation in an individual's response to medical treatment.

== Background ==
Due to genetic heterogeneity, environmental factors, and pathophysiological causes, individuals that exhibit similar disease expression may respond differently to identical drug treatments. Selecting treatments based on factors such as age, body-surface area, weight, gender, or disease stage has been shown to incompletely address this problem, so medical professionals are shifting toward using patient genomic data to select optimal treatments. Now, an increasing amount of evidence shows that epigenetics also plays an important role in determining the safety and efficacy of drug treatment in patients. Epigenetics is a bridge that connects individual genetics and environmental factors to explain some aspects of gene expression. Specifically, environmental factors have the potential to alter one's epigenetic mechanisms in order to influence the expression of genes. For example, smoking cigarettes can alter the DNA methylation state of genes and thereby expression of genes through different mechanisms.

Epigenetic changes in genes caused by factors such as environment can result in abnormal gene expression and the initiation of diseases. The progression of diseases further alters the epigenetic patterns of the whole genome. While epigenetic changes are generally long lasting, and in some cases permanent, there is still the potential to change the epigenetic state of a gene. Thus, drugs have been developed to target aberrant epigenetic patterns in cells to either activate or suppress the epigenetically modified gene expression gene expression. This is known as epigenetic therapy. Besides being drug targets, epigenetic changes are also used as diagnostic and prognostic indicators to predict disease risk and progression, and this could be beneficial for the improvement of personalized medicine.

The development of the Human Epigenome Project and advances in epigenomics has given rise to a burgeoning field known as pharmacoepigenetics. Pharmacoepigenetics was initially developed to study how epigenetic patterns of drug transporters, drug-metabolizing enzymes, and nuclear receptors affect individuals’ response to the drug. Now, pharmacoepigenetics has an additional focus: the development of therapeutic epidrugs that can make changes to the epigenome in order to lessen the cause or symptoms of a disease in an individual. Even though a large gap still remains between the knowledge of epigenetic modifications on drug metabolism mechanisms and clinical applications, pharmacoepigenetics has become a rapidly growing field that has the potential to play an important role in personalized medicine.

In order to develop effective epigenetic therapies, it is important to understand the underlying epigenetic mechanisms and the proteins that are involved. Various mechanisms and modifications play a role in epigenetic remodeling and signaling, including DNA methylation, histone modification, covalent modifications, RNA transcripts, microRNAs, mRNA, siRNA, and nucleosome positioning. In particular, scientists have extensively studied the associations of DNA methylation, histone modifications, regulatory microRNA with the development of diseases.

DNA methylation is the most widely studied epigenetic mechanism. Most of them occur at CpG sites. DNA methyltransferase is recruited to the site and adds methyl groups to the cytosine of the CpG dinucleotides. This allows the methyl-CpG binding proteins to bind to the methylated site and cause downregulation of genes. Histone modification is mainly achieved by modifying the N-terminal tails of histones. The mechanisms include acetylation, methylation, phosphorylation, unbiquitination, etc. They affect the compaction of chromatin structure, the accessibility of the DNA, and therefore the transcriptional level of specific genes.

Additionally, microRNA is a type of noncoding RNA that is responsible for altering gene expression by targeting and marking mRNA transcripts for degradation. Since this process is a posttranscriptional modification, it does not involve changes in DNA sequence. The expression of microRNA is also regulated by other epigenetic mechanisms. Aberrant expression of microRNA facilitates disease development, making them good targets for epigenetic therapies. Epigenetic proteins involved in the regulation of gene transcription fall into three categories-writers, erasers, and readers. Both writers and erasers have enzymatic activity that allows them to covalently modify DNA or histone proteins. Readers have the ability to recognize and bind to specific sites on chromatin to alter epigenetic signatures.

Once the underlying epigenetic mechanisms are understood, it becomes possible to develop new ways to alter epigenetic marks such as "epidrugs", or epigenome editing, which is the overwriting of epigenetic patterns using man-made signals to direct epigenetic proteins to target loci. Furthermore, based on patients' unique epigenetic patterns, medical professionals can more accurately assign a safe and effective treatment including appropriate epigenetic drugs tailored to the patient.

== Drug response and metabolism ==
Individual differences in drug metabolism and response can be partially explained by epigenetic changes. Epigenetic changes in genes that encode drug targets, enzymes, or transport proteins that affect the body's ability to absorb, metabolize, distribute and excrete substances that are foreign to the body (Xenobiotics) can result in changes in one's toxicity levels and drug response. One of the main effects of drug exposure early in life is altered ADME (Absorption, Distribution, Metabolism, and Excretion) gene expression. There is evidence that these genes are controlled by DNA methylation, histone acetylation, and miRNAs. A new emerging field, closely related to pharmacoepigenetics, is toxicoepigenetics that captures toxicological epigenetic changes as a result of the exposure to different compounds (drugs, food, and environment). In this field, there is growing interest in mapping changes in histone modifications and their possible consequences.

More needs to be understood about these mechanisms, but the hope is that it can lead to proper drug selection and dosage. Additionally, drug resistance can be acquired through epigenetic mechanisms. This is particularly common in chemotherapy, where cells that develop resistance to treatment continue to divide and survive. Pharmacoepigenetic treatment plans can consist of a single epidrug class or combine several in a unique therapy. The following are the examples of how drug response or metabolism related proteins are regulated by epigenetic mechanisms:

=== Cyp2e1, DNA methylation, and histone acetylation ===
Age-related changes to epigenetic modifications on regulatory regions of mouse Cyp2e1 has been associated with the metabolism mediated by its encoded protein. Cyp2e1 mediated hydroxylation of its probe drug chlorzoxazone to its metabolite, 6-hydroxychlorzoxazone, correlated negatively with DNA methylation and positively with histone acetylation in mouse microsome extracts.

=== CXCR4 and DNA methylation ===
CXCR4 is a protein that acts as a coreceptor for the entry of HIV. It has been developed as a drug target for anti-HIV therapy. A study has shown that its expression is dysregulated by abnormal methylation patterns in some cancers. Thus, this could affect the efficiency and drug response to the anti-HIV therapy.

=== CYP1A1 methylation and histone modification ===
CYP1A1 is a protein that is well known for its role in chemical compounds and drug metabolism. A study in prostate cancer demonstrated that the protein's regulatory region was under the control of the histone modification H3K4me3, which typically indicates active gene expression in non-cancerous cells. This abnormal methylation typically causes histone modification and changes in chromatin structure at a local level, thus effecting gene expression.

=== ABCG2 and miRNA ===
ABCG2 is a protein that is responsible for multidrug resistance in cancer chemotherapy. Increased expression of ABCG2 is found in different drug resistant cancer cell lines and tumor tissues. One of the microRNA modifications changes its gene and protein expression by destabilizing its mRNA.

== Epigenetics and human diseases ==
=== Epigenetics in cancer ===
While there is still a lot of work that needs to be done regarding the epigenetic modifications of specific cancers at various steps in tumor development, there is a general understanding of epigenetic modifications in genes that lead to abnormal expression and various types of cancer. These epigenetic biomarkers are being considered in clinical use as a tool to detect disease, classify tumors, and understand drug response to treatments such as target compounds, traditional chemotherapy agents, and epigenetic drugs. Human cancer is generally characterized by hypermethylation of specific promoters, which typically prevents the expression of DNA repair and tumor-suppressing genes, and the loss of DNA methylation on a global scale, which can allow for expression of oncogenes or result in a loss of imprinting. Histone modifications play an important role in the regulation of cellular processes, thus epigenetic changes resulting in changed structure can lead to abnormal transcription, DNA repair and replication. Below are some examples and then an overview of the ways these epigenetic modifications are being targeted.

=== Targeting epigenetic modifications in cancer ===
Epigenetic changes are highly present in cancer, therefore it is a good model to assess different ways in which epigenetic drugs can be used to make changes that turn up and turn down gene expression.

==== Targeting gain-of-function epigenetic mutations ====
DNA methyltransferase inhibitors are being pursued due to the hypermethylation of tumor suppressor genes and increased DNMTs that have been observed in cancer cells. Introduction of these inhibitors can result in reduced promoter methylation and expression of previously silenced tumor suppressor genes. Azacitidine and decitabine, which incorporate into the DNA and covalently trap the methyltransferases, have been approved by the FDA for myelodysplastic syndrome (a group of cancers where blood cells from the bone marrow do not mature properly into healthy blood cells) treatment and are currently being investigated for other cancers like leukemia. Other types of drugs are being developed like non-nucleoside analogues, which can covalently bind to DNMTs.

Some examples include procaine, hydralazine, and procainimide, but they lack specificity and potency making it hard to test them in clinical trials. DNA methyltranferase inhibitors are usually used at a low level due to their lack of specificity and toxic effects on normal cells. HDAC inhibitors are also being used, due to the changes in histone acetylation and the increased HDACs observed. While the mechanism is still under investigation, it is believed that adding the HDAC inhibitors results in increased histone acetylation and therefore the reactivation of transcription of tumor suppressor genes.

More so, HDACs can also remove acetyl groups from proteins that are not the histone, so it is thought that adding HDAC inhibitors may result in changes in transcription factor activity. There are around 14 different HDAC inhibitors being investigated in clinical trials for haematological and solid tumors, but more research needs to be done on the specificity and mechanisms by which they are inhibiting. Another way to alter epigenetic modifications is through the use of histone methyltransferase inhibitors.

==== Targeting loss-of-Function epigenetic mutations ====
Loss of function in genes encoding DNA demethylases or the overexpression of DNA methyltransferases can result in the hypermethylation of DNA promoters. Loss of function of DNA methyltransferases can lead to hypomethylation. Loss of function in chromosome remodeling, DNA repair, and cell cycle regulation genes can lead to uncontrolled growth of cells giving rise to cancer. Histone modification patterns can also lead to changes in genomes that can negatively affect these and other systems, making cancer more likely.

Cells that carry loss-of-function mutations can be targeted by drugs that induce synthetic lethality, a genetic/protein interaction where the loss of one component induces little change, but the loss of both components results in cell death. In cancer cells where one part of the interaction experiences a loss-of-function mutation, the other part can be interrupted by drug treatment to induce cell death in cancerous cells. Synthetic lethality is an attractive treatment option in patients with cancer since it there should be minimal / no effect on healthy cells.

For example, with SWI/SNF loss of function mutations, DNA replication and repair is negatively affected and can give rise to tumors if cell growth goes unchecked. Mutations of these genes are common causes of cancers. These mutations are not directly targetable, but several synthetic lethal interactions can be exploited by cancer drugs to kill early cancer growth.

Additionally, loss-of-function mutations can be targeted by using the dynamic states of histone modifications. Loss of function mutations in demethylases, such as KDMK6A are common in cancer. By inducing upregulation of methyltransferase inhibitors, the effects of the loss-of-function mutation can be mitigated.

Development of drugs that target or modify epigenetic signatures of target genes is growing, especially as bioinformatic analysis increases our knowledge of the human genome and speeds up the search for synthetic lethal interactions. Most widely used to assess potential synthetic lethal interactions is using siRNA and CRISPR-Cas9 to modify target genes. CRISPRi and CRISPRa technology allows researchers to activate or inactivate target genes.

=== Lung cancer ===
In lung cancer the activation of both dominant and recessive oncogenes and inactivation of tumor suppressor genes has been observed. Frequently observed in lung cancer is the methylation of gene promoters that are involved in critical functions like cell-cycle control, repairing DNA, cell adhesion, proliferation, apoptosis, and motility. A few of the common genes frequently observed are APC, CDH1, CDKN2A, MGMT, and RASSF1A (a tumor suppressor). In the cases of CDKN2A and RASSF1A DNA these genes are methylated, resulting in the loss of tumor suppressor genes.

Various strategies such as using drugs like entinostat and azacitidine have been observed in clinical trials of non-small-cell lung carcinoma. The idea being that etinostat, a histone deacetylase inhibitor, can prevent the silencing of genes by allowing them to be accessible to transcription machinery. Azacitidine can be metabolized and incorporated into DNA and then recognized as a substrate for DNA methyltransferases, but since the enzyme is bound the methyltransferase cannot add methylation marks and thus silence crucial genes.

=== Heart failure ===
Histone modifications, DNA methylation, and microRNAs have been found to play an important role in heart disease. Previously, histone tail acetylation has been linked to cardiac hypertrophy or abnormal heart muscle thickening that is usually due to an increase in cardiomyocyte size or other cardiac muscle changes. The hypertrophic changes that occur in cardiac muscles cells result from the required acetylation of histone tails via acetyltransferases. In addition to acetyltransferases, histone deacetylases (HDACs) also aid in the regulation of muscle cells. Class II HDACs 5 and 9 inhibit the activity of a factor known as myocyte enhancer factor 2 (MEF2), which unable to bind prevents the expression of genes that produce hypertrophic effects.

Additionally, loci such as PECAM1, AMOTL2 and ARHGAP24 have been seen with different methylation patterns that are correlated with altered gene expression in cardiac tissue.

There are an increasing number of scientific publications that are finding that miRNA plays a key role in various aspects of heart failure. Examples of functions for miRNA include the regulation of the cardiomyocyte cell cycle and regulation of cardiomyocyte cell growth. Knowing the epigenetic modifications allows for the potential use of drugs to modify the epigenetic status of a target sequence. One could possibly target the miRNAs using antagomirs. Antagomirs are single strand RNAs that are complementary, which have been chemically engineered oligonucleotides that silence miRNAs so that they cannot degrade the mRNA that is needed for normal levels of expression.

DNA methylation of CpGs can lead to a reduction of gene expression, and in some cases this decrease in gene product can contribute to disease. Therefore, in those instances it is important to have potential drugs that can alter the methylation status of the gene and increase expression levels. To increase gene expression, one may try to decrease CpG methylation by using a drug that works as DNA methyltransferase inhibitor such as decitabine or 5-aza-2'-deoxycytidine.

On the other hand, some diseases result from a decrease in acetylase activity, which results in a decrease in gene expression. Some studies have shown that inhibiting HDAC activity can attenuate cardiac hypertrophy. trichostatin A and sodium butyrate are two HDAC inhibitors. Trichostatin A is known for its ability to inhibit class I and II HDACs from removing acetylases and decreasing gene expression. Sodium butyrate is another chemical that inhibits class I HDACs, thus resulting in the ability for transcription factors to easily access and express the gene.

=== Challenges in development of epigenetic therapies ===
There are a number of challenges with the developing epigenetic therapies for widespread medical use. While laboratory results indicate relationships between genes and potential drug interactions that could mitigate the effects of mutations, the complexity of the human genome and epigenome makes it difficult to develop therapies that are safe, efficient, and consistent. Epigenetic alteration may affect more systems than the target genes, which gives potential for deleterious effects to rise out of treatment. Additionally, epigenetic mutations can be a result of lineage.

As tissue gene expression is largely regulated by epigenetic interactions, certain tissue-specific cancers are difficult to target with epigenetic therapies. Additionally, genes that encode for elements that prevent one type of cancer in a cell, may have altered function in another and lead to another type of cancer. Trying to modify these proteins, such as EZH2, may give rise to other types of cancer. Selectivity is another hurdle in the development of therapies. Since many proteins are structurally similar, especially within the same protein family, Broad-spectrum inhibitors can't always be used since modifying the regulation of one protein may do the same to others in the family.

Based on the differences in these epigenetic patterns, scientists and physicians can further predict the drug response of each patient. One of the most compelling examples is methylation of the tumor suppressor gene at promoter sequence that codes for MGMT. MGMT is a DNA repair protein responsible for transferring methyl groups from O(6)-alkylguanine in DNA to itself to fight against mutagenesis and the buildup of toxic compounds that result from alkylating agents.

Therefore, MGMT is responsible for the repair of areas that have been damaged by toxins. This MGMT promoter region has been found to be highly methylated, and thereby repressed, in patients with various types of cancer. Several drugs such as procarbazine, streptozotocin, BCNU (carmustine), and temozolomide are designed to remodel DNA to reverse this abnormal methylation modification so that MGMT may be normally expressed and repair DNA. The methylation status of the promoter become the best predictor of responses to BCNU and temozolomide in patients with brain cancer.

== Epigenetic inhibitors and therapies ==
=== Bromodomain and inhibitors (BET inhibitor) ===
Proteins containing bromodomains recognize and bind acetylated lysine residues in histones, causing chromatin structure modification and a subsequent shift in levels of gene expression. Bromodomain and extra-terminal (BET) proteins bind acetyl groups and work with RNAPII to help with transcription and elongation of chromatin. BET inhibitors have been able to prevent successful interaction between BET proteins and acetylated histones. Using a BET inhibitor can reduce the over expression of bromodomain proteins, which can cause aberrant chromatin remodeling, transcription regulation, and histone acetylation.

=== Histone acetylase inhibitors ===
Several studies have shown that histone acetyltransferase (HAT) inhibitors are useful in re-inducing expression of tumor suppression genes by stopping histone acetyltransferase activity to prevent chromatin condensation.

Protein methyltransferase (PMT) inhibitors: PMT's play a key role in methylating lysine and arginine residues to affect transcription levels of genes. It has been suggested that their enzymatic activity plays a role in cancer, as well as neurodegenerative and inflammatory diseases.

=== Histone deacetylase inhibitors ===
Using Histone deacetylase (HDAC) inhibitors allows for genes to remain transcriptionally active. HDACi's have been used in various Autoimmune Disorders, such as systemic lupus erythematosus, rheumatoid arthritis, and systemic onset juvenile idiopathic arthritis. They have also proven useful for treating cancer, since they are structurally diverse and only effect 2-10% of expressed genes. Using HDAC Inhibitors for the treatment of psychiatric and neurodegenerative diseases has shown promising results in early studies. Additionally, studies have demonstrated that HDACi are useful in minimizing damage after a stroke, and encouraging angiogenesis and myogenesis in embryonic cells.

=== DNA methyltransferase inhibitors ===
One of the common characteristics of various types of cancer is hypermethylation of a tumor suppressing gene. Repression of this methyltransferase action at targeted loci can prevent recurring transfer of methyl groups to these sites and keep them open to transcriptional machinery, allowing more tumor-suppression genes to be made. These drugs are typically cytidine derivatives. These drugs tether DNMT to the DNA and prevent their continued action. Treatments that inhibit DNMT function without attachment to DNA (which can cause toxic effects) show they could be effective treatment options but they are not developed enough to see widespread use.

== See also ==
- Epigenetic therapy
- Epigenetics
- Cancer epigenetics
