= TLYA =

TLYA may refer to:

- 23S rRNA (cytidine1920-2'-O)-methyltransferase
- 16S rRNA (cytidine1409-2'-O)-methyltransferase
