= C9H13N3O5 =

The molecular formula C_{9}H_{13}N_{3}O_{5} (molar mass: 243.22 g/mol, exact mass: 243.0855 u) may refer to:

- Cytarabine, or cytosine arabinoside (ara-C)
- Cytidine
