= TRNA:m4X modification enzyme =

Identifiers
- EC no.: 2.1.1.225

Databases
- IntEnz: IntEnz view
- BRENDA: BRENDA entry
- ExPASy: NiceZyme view
- KEGG: KEGG entry
- MetaCyc: metabolic pathway
- PRIAM: profile
- PDB structures: RCSB PDB PDBe PDBsum
Search
- PMC: articles
- PubMed: articles
- NCBI: proteins

TRNA:m4X modification enzyme (EC 2.1.1.225, TRM13, Trm13p, tRNA:Xm4 modification enzyme) is an enzyme with systematic name S-adenosyl-L-methionine:tRNAPro/His/Gly(GCC) (cytidine/adenosine4-2'-O)-methyltransferase. This enzyme catalyses the following chemical reaction

(1) S-adenosyl-L-methionine + cytidine^{4} in tRNAPro $\rightleftharpoons$ S-adenosyl-L-homocysteine + 2'-O-methylcytidine^{4} in tRNAPro
(2) S-adenosyl-L-methionine + cytidine^{4} in tRNAGly(GCC) $\rightleftharpoons$ S-adenosyl-L-homocysteine + 2'-O-methylcytidine^{4} in tRNAGly(GCC)
(3) S-adenosyl-L-methionine + adenosine^{4} in tRNAHis $\rightleftharpoons$ S-adenosyl-L-homocysteine + 2'-O-methyladenosine^{4} in tRNAHis

The enzyme from Saccharomyces cerevisiae 2'-O-methylates cytidine^{4} in tRNAPro and tRNAGly(GCC), and adenosine^{4} in tRNAHis.
