= 23S rRNA (cytidine2498-2'-O)-methyltransferase =

Class of enzymes

Identifiers
- EC no.: 2.1.1.186

Databases
- IntEnz: IntEnz view
- BRENDA: BRENDA entry
- ExPASy: NiceZyme view
- KEGG: KEGG entry
- MetaCyc: metabolic pathway
- PRIAM: profile
- PDB structures: RCSB PDB PDBe PDBsum
Search
- PMC: articles
- PubMed: articles
- NCBI: proteins

23S rRNA (cytidine^{2498}-2'-O)-methyltransferase (EC 2.1.1.186, YgdE, rRNA large subunit methyltransferase M, RlmM) is an enzyme with systematic name S-adenosyl-L-methionine:23S rRNA (cytidine2498-2'-O-)-methyltransferase. This enzyme catalyses the following chemical reaction

S-adenosyl-L-methionine + cytidine^{2498} in 23S rRNA $\rightleftharpoons$ S-adenosyl-L-homocysteine + 2'-O-methylcytidine^{2498} in 23S rRNA
