= Epigenetics in insects =

Epigenetics in insects is the role that epigenetics (heritable characteristics that do not involve changes in DNA sequence) plays in insects.

Epigenetic mechanisms are regulatory mechanisms, which change expression levels of genes. Several mechanisms are considered epigenetic, including DNA methylation, histone modifications and non-coding RNAs. Epigenetic mechanisms play a role in processes like development, learning and memory formation, aging, diseases, cell differentiation and genome defence.

== DNA methylation ==
DNA methylation is an epigenetic mechanism. It is a chemical modification of the DNA where a methyl group is attached to cytosine. This modification is set by DNA methyltransferases (Dnmts). There are three known types of DNA methyltransferases in mammals. Those DNA methyltransferases are present in insects as well, although it varies between different species which specific Dnmt types are present. It still is a matter of discussion what the specific role of DNA methylation in insects is, as some insects such as Drosophila melanogaster just have traces of DNA methylation in their genome and in general insect genomes are much less methylated compared to mammalian genomes (0.034% vs. 7.6% in Mus musculus). In a comparison of different insect species and their respective methylation levels, there was a clear relationship between cell turn over and DNA methylation, but not between genome size or the number of repetitive sequences and DNA methylation.

=== In honeybees ===
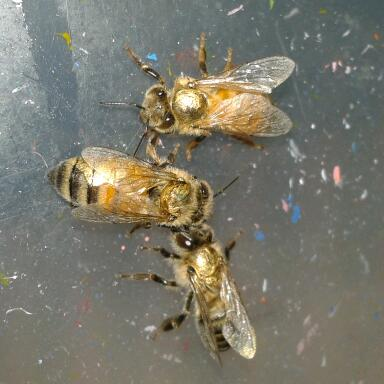
Honeybees (Apis mellifera) marked after hatching with colour

Honeybees (Apis mellifera) possess homologs for all three DNA methyltransferases known in mammals. But unlike mammals they possess two DNA methyltransferases 1 and just one DNA methyltransferase 3. DNA methylation predominantly occurs in coding regions in honeybees. The function of the DNA methylation in honey bees is to regulate gene alternative splicing

==== Development ====
DNA methylation plays a major role in honeybee caste and subcaste development. In honeybees there are two different castes which are workers and queens. They are genetically the same, but show morphological, physiological and behavioral differences. Among the worker caste there are two subcastes, which are nurses and foragers. Which subcaste a worker bee belongs to depends on its age. The DNA methylation pattern in queens and workers, and between nurses and foragers is different. DNA methylation also increases in worker larvae with age, especially in coding regions and CpG islands. If DNA methyltransferase 3 is silenced in honeybee larvae they develop into queens, whereas they otherwise would develop into workers.

==== Associative learning ====
Using the DNA methyltransferase inhibitor zebularine, the role of DNA methyltransferases during learning and memory formation has been studied. If DNA methyltransferases are inhibited during an associative learning paradigm, in which the bee is trained to associate an odour with a food reward, the odour specific associative long-term memory of bees is impaired, as well as their extinction memory. Short-term memory formation and acquisition are not affected by DNA methyltransferase inhibition.

=== In fruitflies ===
The fruitfly D. melanogaster possess just one DNA methyltransferase, which is Dnmt 2-like. Dnmt 2 is not known to methylate DNA in mammals. In Drosophila however a knock down of Dnmt 2-like protein is sufficient to deplete DNA methylation completely and an overexpression of Dnmt 2 causes hypermethylation of the DNA.
