= C9H12N2O5 =

The molecular formula C_{9}H_{12}N_{2}O_{5} (molar mass: 228.20 g/mol, exact mass: 228.0746 u) may refer to:

- Deoxyuridine (dU)
- Zebularine
