= TRNA (cytidine32/guanosine34-2'-O)-methyltransferase =

TRNA (cytidine^{32}/guanosine^{34}-2'-O)-methyltransferase

Identifiers
- EC no.: 2.1.1.205

Databases
- IntEnz: IntEnz view
- BRENDA: BRENDA entry
- ExPASy: NiceZyme view
- KEGG: KEGG entry
- MetaCyc: metabolic pathway
- PRIAM: profile
- PDB structures: RCSB PDB PDBe PDBsum
Search
- PMC: articles
- PubMed: articles
- NCBI: proteins

TRNA (cytidine^{32}/guanosine^{34}-2'-O)-methyltransferase (EC 2.1.1.205, Trm7p) is an enzyme with systematic name S-adenosyl-L-methionine:tRNA (cytidine32/guanosine34-2'-O)-methyltransferase. This enzyme catalyses the following chemical reaction

S-adenosyl-L-methionine + cytidine^{32}/guanosine^{34} in tRNA $\rightleftharpoons$ S-adenosyl-L-homocysteine + 2'-O-methylcytidine^{32}/2'-O-methylguanosine^{34} in tRNA

The enzyme from Saccharomyces cerevisiae catalyses the formation of 2'-O-methylnucleotides at positions 32 and 34 of the yeast tRNAPhe and tRNATrp.
