= TRNA (cytidine32/uridine32-2'-O)-methyltransferase =

TRNA (cytidine^{32}/uridine^{32}-2'-O)-methyltransferase

Identifiers
- EC no.: 2.1.1.200

Databases
- IntEnz: IntEnz view
- BRENDA: BRENDA entry
- ExPASy: NiceZyme view
- KEGG: KEGG entry
- MetaCyc: metabolic pathway
- PRIAM: profile
- PDB structures: RCSB PDB PDBe PDBsum
Search
- PMC: articles
- PubMed: articles
- NCBI: proteins

TRNA (cytidine^{32}/uridine^{32}-2'-O)-methyltransferase (EC 2.1.1.200, YfhQ, tRNA:Cm^{32}/Um^{32} methyltransferase, TrMet(Xm^{32}), TrmJ) is an enzyme with systematic name S-adenosyl-L-methionine:tRNA (cytidine^{32}/uridine^{32}-2'-O)-methyltransferase. This enzyme catalyses the following chemical reaction

(1) S-adenosyl-L-methionine + cytidine^{32} in tRNA $\rightleftharpoons$ S-adenosyl-L-homocysteine + 2'-O-methylcytidine^{32} in tRNA
(2) S-adenosyl-L-methionine + uridine^{32} in tRNA $\rightleftharpoons$ S-adenosyl-L-homocysteine + 2'-O-methyluridine32 in tRNA

In Escherichia coli YfhQ is the only methyltransferase responsible for the formation of 2'-O-methylcytidine32 in tRNA.
