= 16S rRNA (cytidine1409-2'-O)-methyltransferase =

Class of enzymes

16S rRNA (cytidine^{1409}-2'-O)-methyltransferase

Identifiers
- EC no.: 2.1.1.227

Databases
- IntEnz: IntEnz view
- BRENDA: BRENDA entry
- ExPASy: NiceZyme view
- KEGG: KEGG entry
- MetaCyc: metabolic pathway
- PRIAM: profile
- PDB structures: RCSB PDB PDBe PDBsum
Search
- PMC: articles
- PubMed: articles
- NCBI: proteins

16S rRNA (cytidine^{1409}-2'-O)-methyltransferase (EC 2.1.1.227, TlyA) is an enzyme with systematic name S-adenosyl-L-methionine:16S rRNA (cytidine^{1409}-2'-O)-methyltransferase. This enzyme catalyses the following chemical reaction

S-adenosyl-L-methionine + cytidine^{1409} in 16S rRNA $\rightleftharpoons$ S-adenosyl-L-homocysteine + 2'-O-methylcytidine1^{409} in 16S rRNA

The bifunctional enzyme from Mycobacterium tuberculosis.
