= ARHGAP24 =

Protein-coding gene in the species Homo sapiens

Identifiers
- Aliases: ARHGAP24, FILGAP, RC-GAP72, RCGAP72, p73, p73RhoGAP, Rho GTPase activating protein 24
- External IDs: OMIM: 610586; MGI: 1922647; GeneCards: ARHGAP24

Gene location (Human)
Chr.	Chromosome 4 (human)
Band	4q21.23-q21.3	Start	85,475,150 bp
Band	4q21.23-q21.3	End	86,002,668 bp

Gene location (Mouse)
Chr.	Chromosome 5 (mouse)
Band	5|5 E5	Start	102,629,257 bp
Band	5|5 E5	End	103,045,803 bp
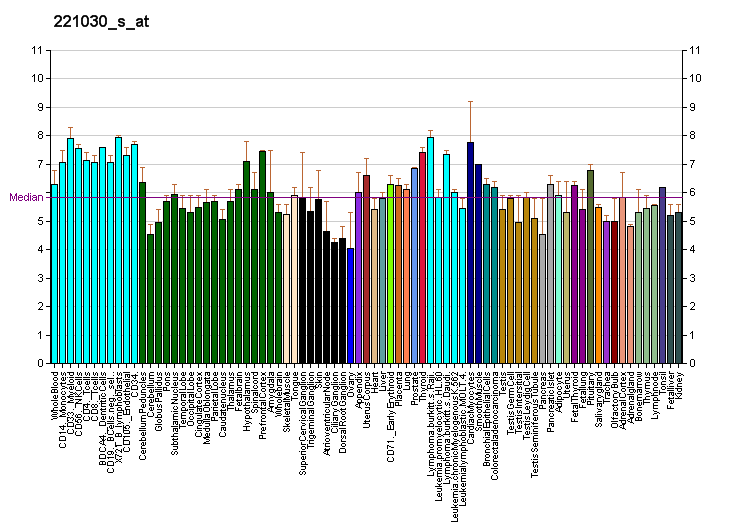
RNA expression pattern
Bgee	Human / Mouse (ortholog); Top expressed in: renal medulla; pons; parotid gland; sural nerve; pylorus; human kidney; epithelium of colon; vena cava; cardia; Achilles tendon / Top expressed in: epithelium of lens; right kidney; sciatic nerve; human kidney; renal cortex; proximal tubule; rib; inner renal medulla; neural layer of retina; soleus muscle; More reference expression data
BioGPS	More reference expression data
Gene ontology
Molecular function	protein binding; GTPase activator activity
Cellular component	cytoplasm; cytosol; adherens junction; cell junction; cell projection; cytoskeleton; focal adhesion
Biological process	multicellular organism development; positive regulation of GTPase activity; cell differentiation; regulation of small GTPase mediated signal transduction; angiogenesis; signal transduction
Sources:Amigo / QuickGO
Orthologs
Databases	NCBI: entry; OMA: entry
Species	Human	Mouse
Entrez	83478	231532
Ensembl	ENSG00000138639	ENSMUSG00000057315
UniProt	Q8N264	Q8C4V1
RefSeq (mRNA)	NM_001025616; NM_001042669; NM_001287805; NM_031305; NM_001346093	NM_001286468; NM_029270; NM_146161; NM_001346585
RefSeq (protein)	NP_001020787; NP_001036134; NP_001274734; NP_001333022; NP_112595	NP_001273397; NP_001333514; NP_083546; NP_666273
Location (UCSC)	Chr 4: 85.48 – 86 Mb	Chr 5: 102.63 – 103.05 Mb
PubMed search
- Wikidata
View/Edit Human	View/Edit Mouse

Rho GTPase-activating protein 24 is an enzyme that in humans is encoded by the ARHGAP24 gene.
