= Druggability =

Biological target that binds to a drug

Venn diagram showing the scope of the human druggable genome.

Druggability is a term used in drug discovery to describe a biological target (such as a protein) that is known or predicted to bind with high affinity to a drug. Importantly, binding of the drug to the target must result in a functional change that provides a therapeutic benefit to the patient. In other words, the target must be disease-modifying. The concept of druggability is most commonly applied to the ability of drug targets to bind small molecules—low molecular weight organic compounds. However, the term has also been extended to encompass biologic medical products, such as therapeutic monoclonal antibodies.

The term “druggable genome” was originally coined by Hopkins et al. to describe proteins with genetic sequences similar to those of known drug targets and capable of binding "rule of five"-compliant small molecules. Related concepts include “ligandability”, “bindability”, and “(chemical) tractability”.

Drug discovery involves a series of stages that progress from a biological hypothesis to an approved drug. The process typically begins with target identification. Candidate targets may be selected based on various experimental criteria, including disease linkage (e.g. mutations in the protein are known to cause disease), mechanistic rationale (e.g. the protein is part of a pathway implicated in disease), or evidence from genetic screens in model organisms. However, disease relevance alone is not sufficient for a protein to serve as a drug target, the target must also be druggable.

== Prediction of druggability ==
If a drug has already been identified for a target, that target is by definition druggable. If no known drugs bind to a target, then druggability is implied or predicted using different methods that rely on evolutionary relationships, 3D-structural properties or other descriptors.

=== Precedence-based ===
A protein is predicted to be "druggable" if it is a member of a protein family for which other members of the family are known to be targeted by drugs (i.e., "guilt" by association). While this is a useful approximation of druggability, this definition has limitations for two main reasons: (1) it highlights only historically successful proteins, ignoring the possibility of a perfectly druggable, but yet undrugged protein family; and (2) assumes that all protein family members are equally druggable.

=== Structure-based ===
This relies on the availability of experimentally determined 3D structures or high quality homology models. A number of methods exist for this assessment of druggability but all of them consist of three main components:

1. Identifying cavities or pockets on the structure
2. Calculating physicochemical and geometric properties of the pocket
3. Assessing how these properties fit a training set of known druggable targets, typically using machine learning algorithms

Early work on introducing some of the parameters of structure-based druggability came from Abagyan and coworkers and then Fesik and coworkers, the latter by assessing the correlation of certain physicochemical parameters with hits from an NMR-based fragment screen. There has since been a number of publications reporting related methodologies.

There are several commercial tools and databases for structure-based druggability assessment. A publicly available database of pre-calculated druggability assessments for all structural domains within the Protein Data Bank (PDB) is provided through the ChEMBL's DrugEBIlity portal.

Structure-based druggability is usually used to identify suitable binding pocket for a small molecule; however, some studies have assessed 3D structures for the availability of grooves suitable for binding helical mimetics. This is an increasingly popular approach in addressing the druggability of protein-protein interactions.

=== Predictions based on other properties ===
As well as using 3D structure and family precedence, it is possible to estimate druggability using other properties of a protein such as features derived from the amino-acid sequence (feature-based druggability) which is applicable to assessing small-molecule based druggability or biotherapeutic-based druggability or the properties of ligands or compounds known to bind the protein (Ligand-based druggability).

=== The importance of training sets ===
All methods for assessing druggability are highly dependent on the training sets used to develop them. This highlights an important caveat in all the methods discussed above: which is that they have learned from the successes so far. The training sets are typically either databases of curated drug targets; screened targets databases (ChEMBL, BindingDB, PubChem etc.); or on manually compiled sets of 3D structure known by the developers to be druggable. As training sets improve and expand, the boundaries of druggability may also be expanded.

== Undruggable targets ==
About 3% of human proteins are known to be "mode of action" drug targets, i.e., proteins through which approved drugs act. Another 7% of the human proteins interact with small molecule chemicals. Based on DrugCentral, 1795 human proteins annotated to interact with 2455 approved drugs.

Furthermore, it is estimated that only 10-15% of human proteins are disease modifying while only 10-15% are druggable (there is no correlation between the two), meaning that only between 1 and 2.25% of disease modifying proteins are likely to be druggable. Hence it appears that the number of new undiscovered drug targets is very limited.

A potentially much larger percentage of proteins could be made druggable if protein–protein interactions could be disrupted by small molecules. However the majority of these interactions occur between relatively flat surfaces of the interacting protein partners and it is very difficult for small molecules to bind with high affinity to these surfaces. Hence these types of binding sites on proteins are generally thought to be undruggable but there has been some progress (by 2009) targeting these sites.

Chemoproteomics techniques have recently expanded the scope of what is deemed a druggable target through the identification of covalently modifiable sites across the proteome.

== See also ==
- Druglikeness
- Lipinski's rule of five

== See also ==
- Druggabbility
