= KP-1461 =

Chemical compound

Clinical data
- Drug class: Reverse transcriptase inhibitor

Legal status
- Legal status: Investigational

Identifiers
- CAS Number: 815588-85-3
- PubChem CID: 51003457
- DrugBank: 05644
- ChemSpider: 32702166
- UNII: 3PEN569TJP
- CompTox Dashboard (EPA): DTXSID101112194

Chemical and physical data
- Formula: C_{16}H_{23}N_{4}O_{6}
- Molar mass: 367.382 g·mol^{−1}
- 3D model (JSmol): Interactive image
- SMILES: CCCCCCCOC(=O)NC1=NCN(C(=O)N1)[C@H]2C[C@@H]([C@H](O2)CO)O
- InChI: InChI=1S/C16H28N4O6/c1-2-3-4-5-6-7-25-16(24)19-14-17-10-20(15(23)18-14)13-8-11(22)12(9-21)26-13/h11-13,21-22H,2-10H2,1H3,(H2,17,18,19,23,24)/t11-,12+,13+/m0/s1; Key:SZWIAFVYPPMZML-YNEHKIRRSA-N

KP-161 is an experimental antiviral drug being studied for the treatment of HIV/AIDS. It belongs to the class of nucleoside reverse transcriptase inhibitors.

KP-1461 is a prodrug of the active antiviral agent KP-1212.
