= Judith Potashkin =

American neurobiologist

- Education: State University of New York at Buffalo
- Scientific career
- Workplaces: Rosalind Franklin University of Medicine and Science
- Thesis: Isolation and characterization of residual nuclei from S̲a̲c̲c̲h̲a̲r̲o̲m̲y̲c̲e̲s̲ c̲e̲r̲e̲v̲i̲s̲i̲a̲e̲ (1985)

Judith Ann Potashkin is an American professor at Rosalind Franklin University of Medicine and Science. She is best known for her research on diseases such as Parkinson's and Alzheimer's. She is an elected fellow of the American Association for the Advancement of Science.

== Education and career ==
Potashkin has an undergraduate degree from Lehigh University (1977), and an M.S. in from Pennsylvania State University where she worked on the connection between ribosomal RNA synthesis and viruses. In 1985, Potashkin earned her Ph.D. from the State University of New York at Buffalo working on residual nuclei in yeast. Following her Ph.D. she was a postdoctoral scientist at Cold Spring Harbor Laboratory. She moved to Chicago Medical School in 1990 where she is a tenured professor.

== Research ==
Potashkin is known for her research on the role of RNA in neurodegenerative diseases. Her early research examined residual nuclei in Saccharomyces cerevisiae. She went on to examine the genes involved in RNA splicing and identified defects in RNA processing. Her research on Parkinson's disease includes defining biomarkers, characterizing dysregulated pathways, and assessing the role of nutrition. Her research also extends into investigations of Alzheimer's disease.

== Selected publications ==
- Santiago, Jose A.; Potashkin, Judith A. (2013). "Shared dysregulated pathways lead to Parkinson's disease and diabetes". Trends in Molecular Medicine. 19 (3): 176–186. doi:10.1016/j.molmed.2013.01.002. PMID 23375873.
- Seidl, Stacey E.; Santiago, Jose A.; Bilyk, Hope; Potashkin, Judith A. (2014-03-07). "The emerging role of nutrition in Parkinson's disease". Frontiers in Aging Neuroscience. 6: 36. doi:10.3389/fnagi.2014.00036. ISSN 1663-4365. PMC 3945400. PMID 24639650.
- Santiago, Jose A.; Potashkin, Judith A. (2015-02-17). "Network-based metaanalysis identifies HNF4A and PTBP1 as longitudinally dynamic biomarkers for Parkinson's disease". Proceedings of the National Academy of Sciences. 112 (7): 2257–2262. Bibcode:2015PNAS..112.2257S. doi:10.1073/pnas.1423573112. ISSN 0027-8424. PMC 4343174. PMID 25646437.
- Santiago, Jose A.; Littlefield, Alyssa M.; Potashkin, Judith A. (2016). "Integrative transcriptomic meta-analysis of Parkinson's disease and depression identifies NAMPT as a potential blood biomarker for de novo Parkinson's disease". Scientific Reports. 6 (1) 34579. Bibcode:2016NatSR...634579S. doi:10.1038/srep34579. ISSN 2045-2322. PMC 5041099. PMID 27680512.

== Awards and honors ==
Potashkin was elected a fellow of the American Association for the Advancement of Science in 2020.
