= GNAS-AS1 =

Non-coding RNA in the species Homo sapiens

Identifiers
- Aliases: GNAS-AS1, GNAS-AS, GNAS1AS, GNASAS, NCRNA00075, NESP-AS, NESPAS, SANG, GNAS antisense RNA 1
- External IDs: OMIM: 610540; GeneCards: GNAS-AS1

Gene location (Human)
Chr.	Chromosome 20 (human)
Band	20q13.32	Start	58,818,918 bp
Band	20q13.32	End	58,850,903 bp
RNA expression pattern
Bgee	Human / Mouse (ortholog); Top expressed in: islet of Langerhans; tibia; ventricular zone; gonad; ganglionic eminence; muscle of thigh; stromal cell of endometrium; anterior pituitary; Achilles tendon; right testis / n/a; More reference expression data
BioGPS	n/a
Orthologs
Databases	NCBI: entry; OMA: entry
Species	Human	Mouse
Entrez	149775	n/a
Ensembl	ENSG00000235590	n/a
UniProt	n a	n/a
RefSeq (mRNA)	n/a	n/a
RefSeq (protein)	n/a	n/a
Location (UCSC)	Chr 20: 58.82 – 58.85 Mb	n/a
PubMed search		n/a
- Wikidata
View/Edit Human

In molecular biology, GNAS antisense RNA (non-protein coding), also known as GNAS-AS1, is a long non-coding RNA.It is antisense to the GNAS gene. It is an imprinted gene, expressed only from the paternal allele, suggesting that it may have a role in suppression of the paternal NESP55 allele encoded by GNAS.

== See also ==
- Long noncoding RNA
