= Cytidine =

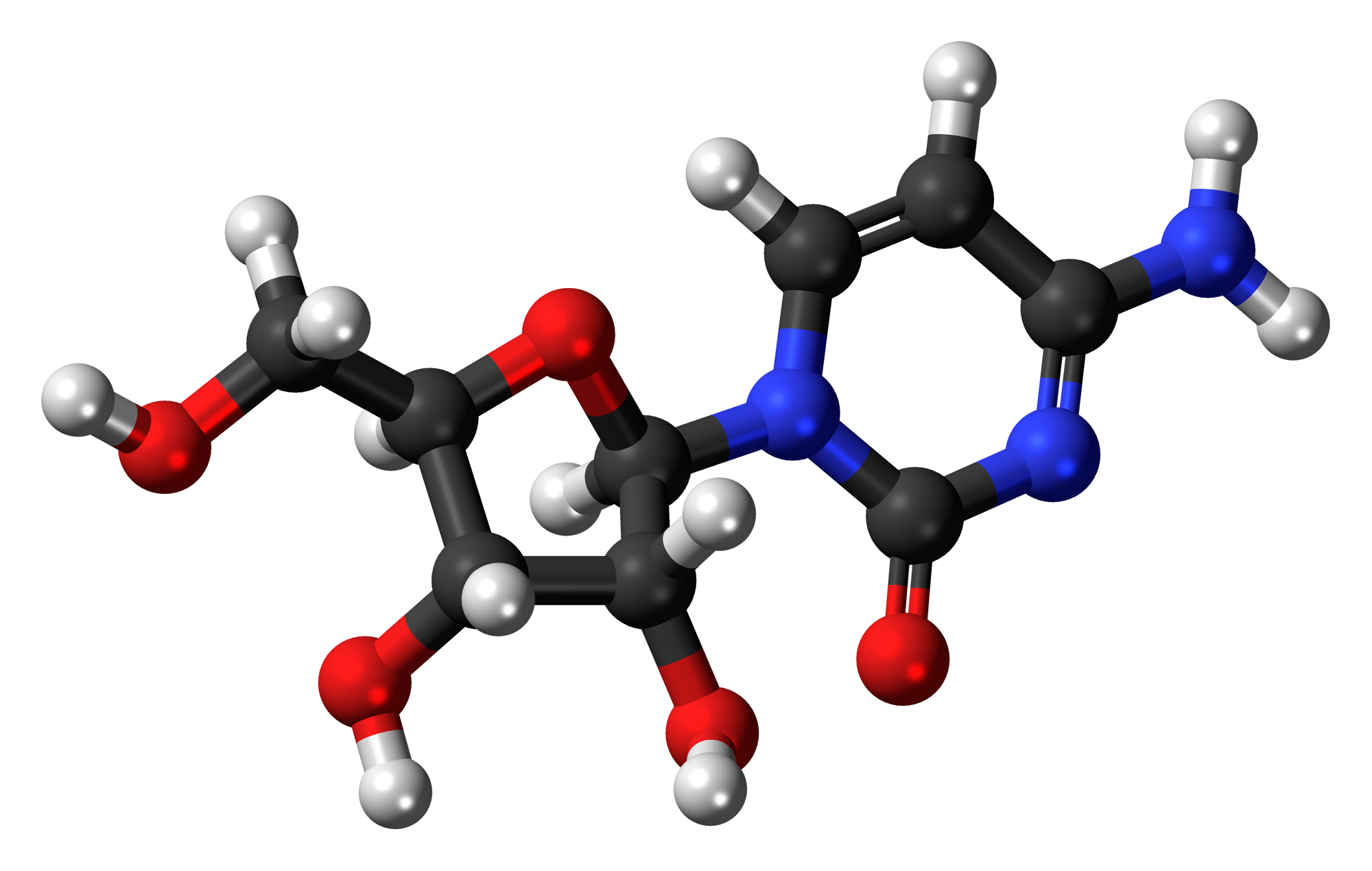

Names
- IUPAC name Cytidine
- Systematic IUPAC name 4-Amino-1-[(2R,3R,4S,5R)-3,4-dihydroxy-5-(hydroxymethyl)oxolan-2-yl]pyrimidin-2(1H)-one
- Other names 4-Amino-1-β-D-ribofuranosyl-2(1H)-pyrimidinone; 4-Amino-1-[3,4-dihydroxy-5-(hydroxymethyl)tetrahydrofuran-2-yl]pyrimidin-2-one

Identifiers
CAS Number	65-46-3
3D model (JSmol)	Interactive image
ChEBI	CHEBI:17562
ChEMBL	ChEMBL95606
ChemSpider	5940
ECHA InfoCard	100.000.555
IUPHAR/BPS	4728
KEGG	D07769
MeSH	Cytidine
PubChem CID	6175
UNII	5CSZ8459RP
CompTox Dashboard (EPA)	DTXSID60891552
- InChI: InChI=1S/C9H13N3O5/c10-5-1-2-12(9(16)11-5)8-7(15)6(14)4(3-13)17-8/h1-2,4,6-8,13-15H,3H2,(H2,10,11,16)/t4-,6-,7-,8-/m1/s1 Key: UHDGCWIWMRVCDJ-XVFCMESISA-N; InChI=1/C9H13N3O5/c10-5-1-2-12(9(16)11-5)8-7(15)6(14)4(3-13)17-8/h1-2,4,6-8,13-15H,3H2,(H2,10,11,16)/t4-,6-,7-,8-/m1/s1 Key: UHDGCWIWMRVCDJ-XVFCMESIBD
- SMILES: O=C1/N=C(/N)\C=C/N1[C@@H]2O[C@@H]([C@@H](O)[C@H]2O)CO

Properties
Chemical formula	C_{9}H_{13}N_{3}O_{5}
Molar mass	243.219 g·mol^{−1}
Appearance	white, crystalline powder
Melting point	230 °C (decomposes)
Magnetic susceptibility (χ)	−123.7·10^{−6} cm^{3}/mol
- Except where otherwise noted, data are given for materials in their standard state (at 25 °C [77 °F], 100 kPa). verify (what is ?) Infobox references

Cytidine (symbol C or Cyd) is a nucleoside molecule that is formed when cytosine is attached to a ribose ring (also known as a ribofuranose) via a β-N_{1}-glycosidic bond. Cytidine is a component of RNA. It is a white water-soluble solid that is only slightly soluble in ethanol.

== Dietary sources ==
Dietary sources of cytidine include foods with high RNA (ribonucleic acid) content, such as organ meats, brewer's yeast, as well as pyrimidine-rich foods such as beer. During digestion, RNA-rich foods are broken-down into ribosyl pyrimidines (cytidine and uridine), which are absorbed intact. In humans, dietary cytidine is converted into uridine, which is probably the compound behind cytidine's metabolic effects.

== Cytidine analogues ==
A variety of cytidine analogues are known, some with potentially useful pharmacology. For example, KP-1461 is an anti-HIV agent that works as a viral mutagen, and zebularine exists in E. coli and is being examined for chemotherapy. Low doses of azacitidine and its analog decitabine have shown results against cancer through epigenetic demethylation.

== Biological actions ==
In addition to its role as a pyrimidine component of RNA, cytidine has been found to control neuronal-glial glutamate cycling, with supplementation decreasing midfrontal/cerebral glutamate/glutamine levels. As such, cytidine has generated interest as a potential glutamatergic antidepressant drug.

== Related compounds ==
- Deoxycytidine is cytosine attached to a deoxyribose.
