= Microsphere (disambiguation) =

A microsphere is a small spherical microparticle, with diameters typically ranging from 1 μm to 1000 μm (1 mm).

Microsphere may also refer to:

- Microsphere (software company), a 1980s software company who made several critically acclaimed games for the ZX Spectrum

== See also ==
- Glass microsphere
- Expandable microsphere
- Microbead
- Microbead (research)
- Optical microsphere
