= Clean Water Action =

American environmental advocacy group

- Founded: 1972
- Location: Washington, D.C.
- Region served: United States
- President & CEO: Jeff Carter
- Revenue: $5.22 million (2023)
- Website: cleanwateraction.org

Clean Water Action is an American environmental advocacy group. Created in 1972, the group focuses on canvassing and gaining support for political issues and candidates. It is a 501(c)(4) organization and is based in Washington, D.C.

== History ==
The group was formed in 1972 by David Zwick as a grassroots and lobbying organization whose goal was to enact platforms delineated in the Zwick publication, Water Wasteland. To reach this goal, Zwick outlined a grassroots strategy of door-to-door canvassing and public education. One of its first accomplishments occurred in 1986 when, along with the National Campaign Against Toxic Hazards, the group published a report claiming the Environmental Protection Agency was failing to properly enforce the federal Superfund toxic waste cleanup program.

== Political advocacy ==
Clean Water Action has endorsed both causes and political actors. In 2008, Clean Water Action and Earthjustice brought a lawsuit against the Pennsylvania Department of Environmental Protection for not complying with state and federal water protection laws by allowing partially treated fracking wastewater to be discharged into the Monongahela River. The court ruled in favor of the plaintiff. In 2012, the group supported the re-election of President Barack Obama.

Clean Water Action also has been involved in campaigns to reduce the environmental impact of plastics through their support of California's Assembly Bill 888, which proposed to ban the use of plastic microbeads in rinse-off personal care products. Similar federal legislation was enacted with the passing of the Microbead–Free Waters Act of 2015. The group also supported Minneapolis's ordinance restricting the use of single-use plastic bags.

== See also ==
- Clean Water Act
- Regional Greenhouse Gas Initiative
- Safe Drinking Water Act
- Superfund
