= Expandable microsphere =

Expandable microspheres are microscopic spheres comprising a thermoplastic shell encapsulating a low-boiling-point liquid hydrocarbon. When heated to a temperature high enough to soften the thermoplastic shell, the increasing pressure of the hydrocarbon will cause the microsphere to expand. The volume can increase by 60 to 80 times.

== Expandable microsphere ==
The expandable microsphere is a material that can act as a blowing agent when mixed in a product and subsequently heated to cause expansion within the matrix. The expandable microspheres are off-white, can be 6 to 40 micrometers in average diameter and have a density of 900 to 1400 kg/m^{3}. The expandable microspheres are used as a blowing agent in products like e.g. puff ink, automotive underbody coatings or injection molding of thermoplastics. Here the product must be heated at some point in the process for the expandable microspheres to expand.

== Expanded microsphere ==
The expanded microsphere is a material that has been heated to cause expansion. The product acts as a lightweight filler in many products. The expanded microspheres are white, can be 15 to 90 micrometers in average diameter and can have a density of 15 to 70 kg/m^{3}. The expanded microspheres are used as a lightweight filler in composite materials such as cultured marble, in waterborne paints and crack fillers/joint compound.

== Characteristics ==
Characteristics that make expandable microspheres unique,

- Ability to expand
- Resilient
- Ultra-low density when expanded
- Closed cells that can be distributed evenly
- Can introduce a pressure in the production process

== See also ==
- Cenosphere
- Glass microsphere
- Microbead
- Microplastics
- Plastic particle water pollution
