= 2025 North Sea ship collision =

Collision between two ships in the North Sea

Coordinates: 53°44′11″N 0°23′37″E

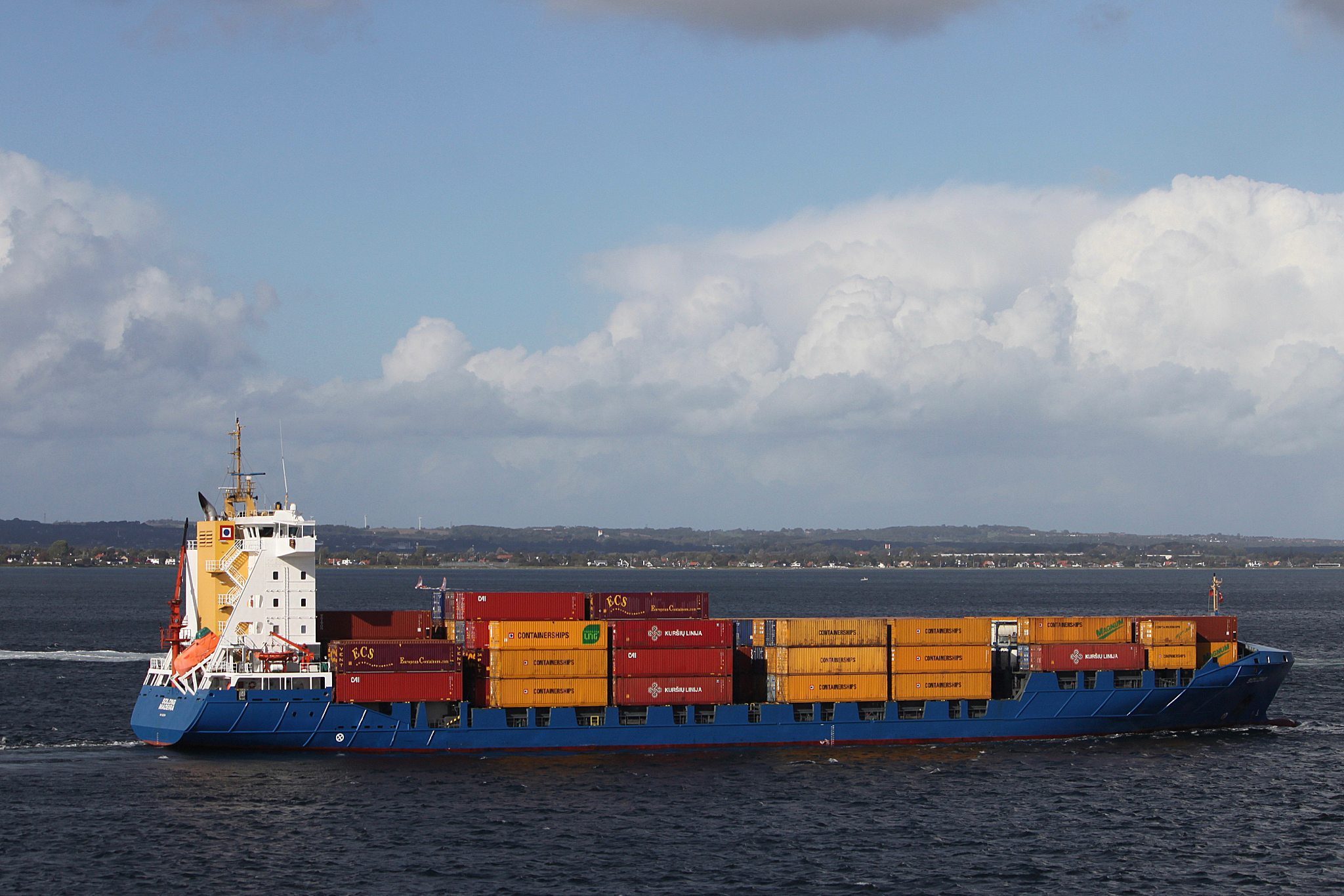
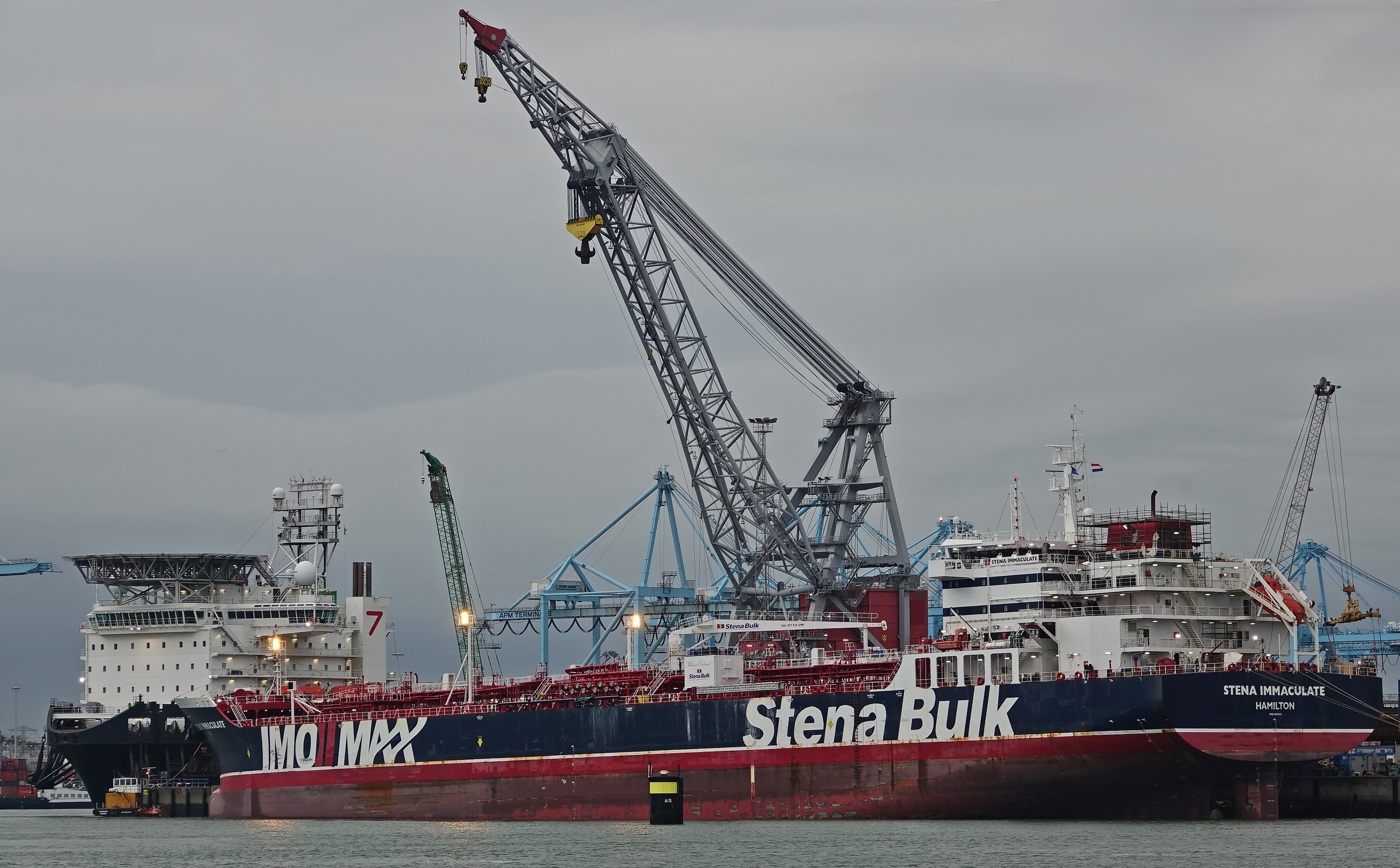
- MV Solong (pictured in 2018) MV Stena Immaculate (pictured in 2019)
- Date: 10 March 2025
- Location: North Sea off Spurn Head, East Yorkshire, United Kingdom
- Type: Ship collision
- Deaths: 1 (presumed)
- Injuries: 1

On 10 March 2025, the container ship MV Solong collided with the oil tanker MV Stena Immaculate, which was at anchor in the North Sea off the coast of East Yorkshire.

Solong, a Portuguese ship flagged out of Madeira, was carrying alcohol, but was also initially thought to have been carrying sodium cyanide. The US-registered Stena Immaculate was carrying aviation fuel on a charter for the United States Air Force (USAF); both ships also had a supply of heavy fuel for their own use. Following several explosions, both vessels caught fire and were abandoned. They remained entangled for the rest of the day, then later they separated. Solong began to drift. Thirty-six people were rescued, with one hospitalised, and one missing, presumed dead.

There was no indication of any third-party or malicious involvement in the crash, and primary concerns were to limit potential environmental damage from leaking aviation and ship fuel. A rescue operation involving several European countries was delayed due to fog.

An investigation involving the two flagged countries and the UK was announced on 11 March. The same day, Humberside Police opened a criminal investigation and arrested the 59-year-old Russian captain of Solong. On 14 March he was charged with gross negligence manslaughter of the missing crewmember and remanded in custody. On 30 May he pleaded not guilty to the charge at the Old Bailey. On 2 February 2026, following a trial at the Old Bailey, he was found guilty of gross negligence manslaughter. He was later sentenced to six years imprisonment.

== Involved ships ==
Diagram illustrating relative vessel sizes

The vessels involved were the Portuguese-registered container ship MV Solong, flagged out of Madeira, and the US-registered oil tanker MV Stena Immaculate.

=== MV Solong ===
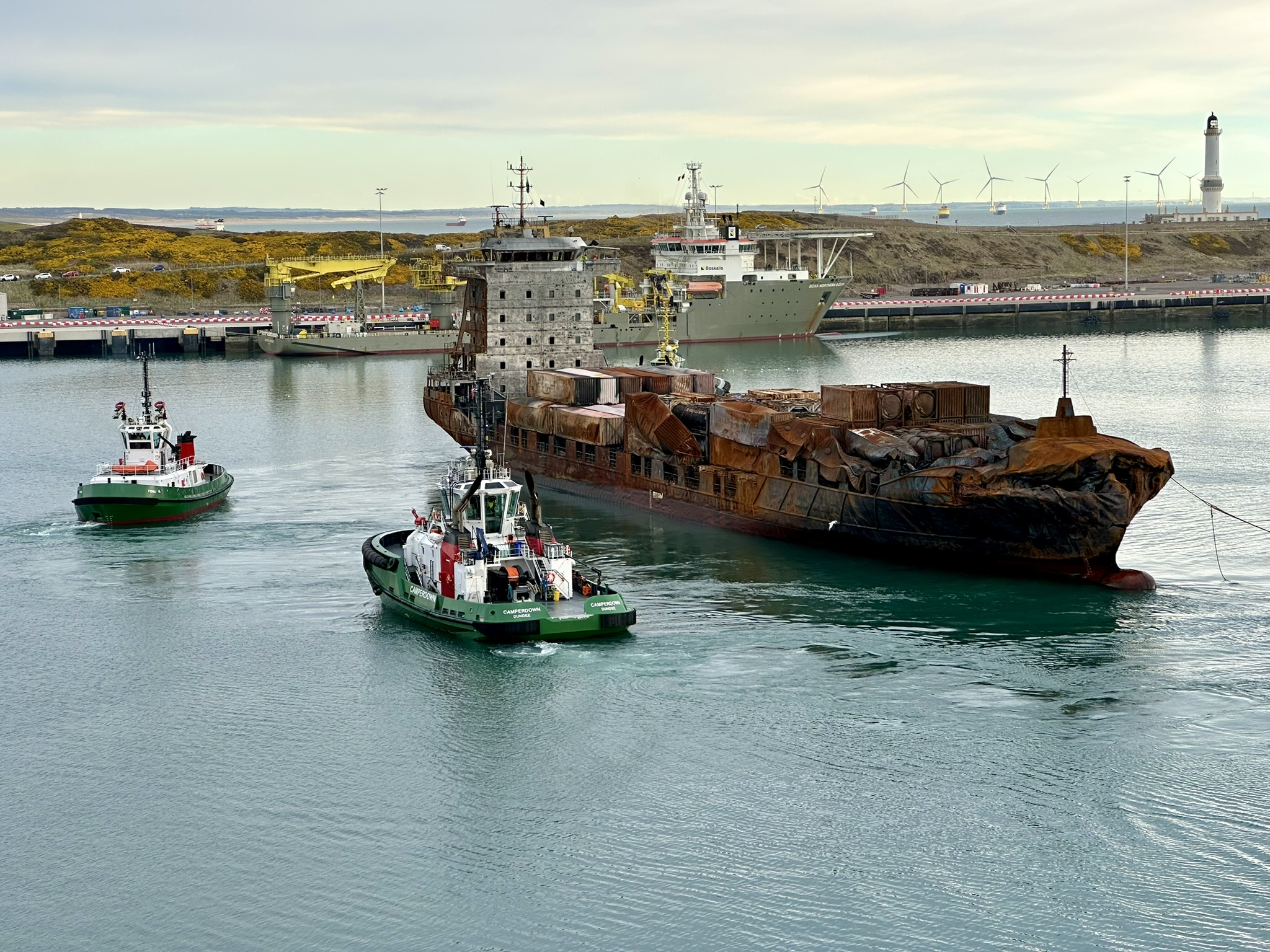
Damaged MV Solong arrives in Aberdeen South Harbour.

Solong is a feeder vessel 140 metres (459 ft 4 in) long, with a capacity of 804 twenty-foot equivalent units. She was built in 2005 and owned by Ernst Russ AG, a publicly-traded Hamburg-based shipping firm. Her cargo included alcohol, and early reports also indicated that she was also transporting 15 containers of sodium cyanide, a toxic chemical. However, Ernst Russ subsequently described this as "misrepresentation", saying that although she had previously carried the chemical, there were only four empty tanks that had contained it on board. The captain was a Russian national, and the remaining 13 crew were Filipino or Russian.

In July 2024 Solong was reported in Irish safety checks to have ten outstanding issues including emergency steering compass not readable, inadequate alarms, poorly maintained survival craft and fire door deficiencies. In October 2024 a Scottish inspection noted lifebuoys were inadequately marked. Ernst Russ reported that all identified safety issues had been rectified. Similar issues had been reported in previous inspections, but this is not considered unusual in ships of this age and faults were not sufficient to prevent the ship sailing, rather being advisory to carry out repairs. The ship had taken an almost identical route through the anchorage where the collision occurred several times in the last few months. Solong was towed in to Aberdeen in late March.

=== MV Stena Immaculate ===
Stena Immaculate is an IMOIIMAX-class chemical products carrier (also described as an oil tanker) and is 183 metres (600 ft 5 in) long with a beam of 32 metres (105 ft), a deadweight tonnage of 49,729 and a gross tonnage of 29,666. She was built in 2017 at the Guangzhou Shipyard International with the yard number 12130009, and is owned by Stena AB and operated by Crowley Maritime of Florida. She was on a short-term charter to the US government as part of the US Government Tanker Security Program and was transporting 220,000 barrels (35,000,000 L; 9,200,000 US gal) of Jet A-1 aviation fuel in 16 secure tanks to the Port of Killingholme, Lincolnshire, for the use of the United States Air Force. All 23 crew were USA nationals. Stena Immaculate was towed in to Great Yarmouth, Norfolk on 11 April.

== Incident ==
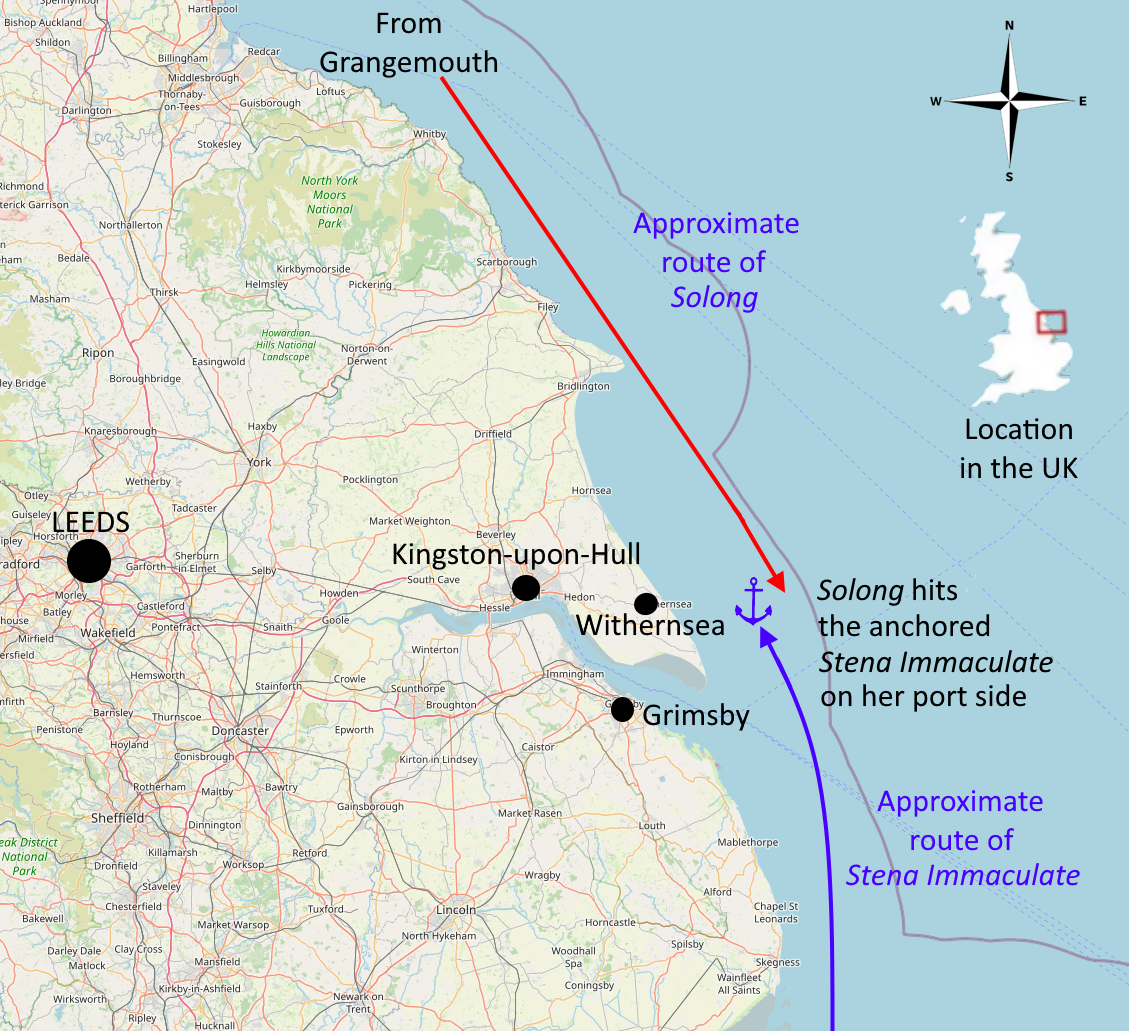
Schematic of the incident

Solong had departed from Grangemouth and was en route to Rotterdam, due to arrive on the evening of 10 March. Stena Immaculate had travelled from Agioi Theodoroi in Greece, and was at anchor 14 nautical miles (26 km) north-east of Spurn Head, waiting to arrive at Killingholme. This location was a common but uncharted anchorage for vessels off the Humber; five other tankers and three bulk carriers were also anchored at this location at the time of the collision.

At 01:30 GMT on 10 March, Solong passed Longstone Lighthouse off the Northumberland coast, before taking a 150° heading. At 09:47, it struck Stena Immaculate at a cruising speed of around 16.4 knots (30.4 km/h). Crews reported multiple explosions. Abdul Khalique, head of Liverpool John Moores University's Maritime Centre, said that "MV Stena Immaculate's heading was approx around 065° when she was hit on her port side by MV Solong at 9:48:07 between the rear half of MV Stena Immaculate's length". The ships may have remained connected for up to four minutes until disengaging. Only one of the tanker's cargo tank compartments was ruptured.

Early reports suggested that a "massive fireball" had engulfed the tanker after the collision, which remained on fire with her cargo leaking into the sea. Her on-board fire suppression system appears to have functioned as required. Solong was also reported to be on fire. HM Coastguard was alerted to the incident at 09:48. Royal National Lifeboat Institution crews from Bridlington, Mablethorpe, Skegness, and Cleethorpes were deployed. A crew transfer vessel was in the area already, and rescue helicopter, boats and a fire-fighting aircraft were also deployed. Occupants of both vessels abandoned ship. The Port of Grimsby East stated that 32 people had been brought ashore, but others were unaccounted for. One person was hospitalised. Stena Bulk confirmed that all 20 onboard Stena Immaculate had been accounted for and were safe, but by nightfall one member from Solong, a Filipino national, was missing after having entered the water and not been among those rescued. The search was called off later that night, the crewmember presumed dead.

The Met Office had issued a warning of fog for the Humber area which was valid at the time of the incident, although this would not affect the ships' automatic identification systems (AIS) and they would still be able to warn other vessels of their approach.

== Aftermath ==
A three-nautical-mile (5.6 km), 2,000-foot (610 m) no-fly zone was imposed around the affected area, with a one-kilometre (0.62 mi) exclusion zone around each vessel. All maritime traffic was confined to port along the east coast. Thick black smoke and fires still burned on 11 March, hampering early investigation, and further fires were suspected below decks.

The two ships initially remained entangled, but separated overnight of their own accord, and although the fire on board Stena Immaculate was still burning the next day, it had greatly reduced in intensity. The ship had sustained a large hole in its side and was seen to be taking on water, although on-board generators were still operating. Solong drifted into the Humber, shadowed by several tugboats. Badly damaged and still alight after the fire on Stena Immaculate had burnt out, Solong was initially considered likely to sink, whilst Stena Immaculate was built with a double hull and watertight compartments designed to mitigate the possibility. By the afternoon of 11 March, both ships were considered likely to remain afloat. By 15 March, Solong had drifted several miles to the south and could be seen off the Lincolnshire coast. Stena Immaculate remained at anchor where she had been struck. Firefighting tugs were in the vicinity of both vessels, although by this point only isolated pockets of fire were present on Solong. Salvors had boarded both vessels to assess damage, and aerial surveillance indicated risks of further environmental damage were minimal.

== Investigation ==
The Telegraph subsequently reported that UK government sources had not ruled out the possibility of "foul play", although early reports did not indicate third-party involvement or other malicious activity. The US government also refused to rule out criminal activity, "amid questions about why the cargo ship [...] appeared not to slow down or change course before striking the Stena Immaculate". The governments of the United States and Portugal announced their own investigations into the crash on 11 March, which would work alongside that of the UK.

=== Analysis ===
Chris Parry, a retired rear admiral with the Royal Navy, believed that the crash was caused by negligence, based on the likelihood of anchored ships being present in the area and the danger of travelling through at speed. It was a particularly busy area for shipping as it was a direct route to the Netherlands and Germany, as well as Scandinavia. Maritime analyst David McFarlane stated the AIS can provide warning of other vessels within 24 miles (39 km), and that both ships should have had lookouts. He also noted that a ship at anchor could take up to an hour to raise it, which would impede its ability to avoid a collision. A computer reconstruction by Khalique suggested that the lookouts may not have been performing their duties optimally; while fog would have hampered visibility for them, they may not have been checking their radar.

The Marine Accident Investigation Branch (MAIB) is leading an investigation with assistance from the U.S. National Transportation Safety Board and Portuguese Marine Safety Investigation Authority, part of which will involve recovery of the vessels' voyage data recorders. The investigation's early findings reported that Solong was travelling a route it regularly took.

On 3 April 2025 the MAIB released an interim report, with new images of the incident. The report said "Neither Solong nor Stena Immaculate had a dedicated lookout on the bridge." The MAIB said its full investigation would examine "navigation and watchkeeping practices, manning and fatigue management, the condition and maintenance of the vessels involved and the environmental conditions at the time of crash."

=== Legal ===
After the Coastguard called off the search for the missing crewmember on 11 March, Humberside Police opened a criminal investigation and arrested Solong's 59-year-old Russian captain on suspicion of gross negligence manslaughter. On 14 March he was charged with the offence and was remanded in police custody to appear at Hull Magistrates Court the following day. On 15 March no application for bail was made and the captain was remanded in custody. No pleas were entered and he appeared on 14 April at the Old Bailey to confirm his identity, and on 30 May, he pleaded not guilty before the court via video link from prison. A trial date was set for 12 January 2026. On 2 February 2026, following a trial at the Old Bailey, he was found guilty of gross negligence manslaughter. On 5 February 2026, Mr Justice Andrew Baker sentenced him to six years imprisonment.

== Impact ==
The coastguard reported that "the incident remains ongoing and an assessment of the likely counter pollution response required is being enacted", while Greenpeace UK stated it was too early to calculate the environmental damage. Aviation fuel had begun to leak, raising fears for local bird and aquatic life. While it is less viscous than crude, so should not clog birds' feathers, it is poisonous. The heavy fuel powering both ships, however, is thick enough to smother birds, although in the aftermath of the crash it was unknown if this, as well as the aviation fuel, had leaked.

Animals likely to be affected included puffins, razorbills, gannets and kittiwakes. Due to the approach of nesting season, birds were gathering off shore as well as on local mudflats and other protected areas such as Holderness conservation zone. Also thought to be at risk were grey seals, porpoises, various species of cetaceans, ocean quahogs, oysters, seagrass and commercial fish stocks. The MAIB organised a unit to begin an assessment, comprising specialist pollution experts, international firefighters, marine chemists, and hazardous materials experts. Dutch salvage company Boskalis was awarded the contract to salvage Stena Immaculate, and sent a specialist gas engineer, to measure the extent to which harmful substances were released.

The cost of the damage was estimated at around tens of millions of pounds. While it was Solong which had hit Stena Immaculate, environmental lawyers noted that it was the latter's owners who were strictly liable for the contents of its cargo, and any damage caused by it, while both ships' owners would be liable for damage caused by any fuel leaks, although under the Merchant Shipping Act 1995 the British government is likely to underwrite the immediate costs of clean up and rescue. (Note: Possibly attempting to recover these costs from the vessels' owners and insurers later on.) Other affected parties, such as fishermen, local government and tourist operators could also claim.

On 17 March it was reported that "nurdles", small pieces of plastic resin used in plastics manufacturing, had begun to be washed ashore. The Maritime and Coastguard Agency (MCA) reported that they had been initially alerted to the hazard, just off the Wash, by the RNLI, on 16 March.
