= Microbead-Free Waters Act of 2015 =

- Long title: An act to amend the Federal Food, Drug, and Cosmetic Act to prohibit the manufacture and introduction or delivery for introduction into interstate commerce of rinse-off cosmetics containing intentionally-added plastic microbeads
- Enacted by: the 114th United States Congress

Citations
- Public law: Pub. L. 114–114 (text) (PDF)

Codification
- Acts amended: Federal Food, Drug, and Cosmetic Act of 1938
- Titles amended: 21 U.S.C.: Food and Drugs
- U.S.C. sections amended: 21 U.S.C. ch. 9 § 301

Legislative history
- Introduced in the House as H.R. 1321 by Frank Pallone (D–NJ) on 2015-03-04; Committee consideration by House Committee on Energy and Commerce; Signed into law by President Barack Obama on 2015-12-28

The Microbead-Free Waters Act of 2015 is a United States law that prohibits the addition of plastic microbeads in the manufacturing of certain personal care products, such as toothpaste. The purpose of the law is to reduce water pollution caused by these products. Manufacture of the microbead-containing products was prohibited in July 2017, and retail sales are prohibited as of July 2018.

== Background ==
Over the course of the past 50 years, plastics have increasingly become a large part of people's lives all around the world. Due to the durability, versatility, and low cost of plastics, consumers and industries utilize plastics for a variety of products. However, with increased production and consumption of plastics comes an increase in plastic waste that inevitably makes its way into the ocean. Scientists estimate that there is over 150 million tons of plastic residing in the World's oceans today.

Plastics are made from petroleum and resist biodegradation; they absorb persistent organic pollutants, leach chemicals that are toxic to humans and other organisms, degrade ocean and terrestrial ecosystems, and may impact migratory patterns, trophic structures (food chains), and habitats around the world. Plastics are a direct threat to the well-being of marine life as they can lead to entanglement causing animals to drown, it can impair their ability to catch food, and ingested plastics can block digestive tracts and cause starvation and even death. The detrimental impacts that plastics have on individual animals affects not only their livelihood, but may also affect the balance of ocean ecosystem and the ecological services they provide for human benefit. With the numerous health and environmental concerns that plastics pose, bans against many single use plastic products have become more and more prevalent throughout local and state governments in the United States and even in other countries across the globe.

The United Nations Joint Group of Experts on the Scientific Aspects of Marine Pollution (GESAMP) estimated that roughly 80% of ocean pollution comes from anthropogenic activity, with plastics making up 60-95% of it. Plastic particles are found throughout all of the oceans worldwide and they accumulate in gyres located in between Earth's continents. Plastics that persist in the environment come from a wide range of sources including plastic bags, beverage containers, plastic packaging, fishing lines and ropes, and microplastics. Microplastics are defined as plastic particles up to five millimeters in diameter and include fragments from larger, previously broken down plastic items, clothing fibers (acrylic and polyester), and small particles referred to as microbeads.

Microbeads are purposefully manufactured for cosmetics, cleaning products, and personal care products in many countries. They are too small to be recycled like other plastics, allowing them to accumulate and persist in the environment in large quantities. Since they are typically designed to be "rinsed-off," microbeads easily make their way through sewage treatment plants and into surface waters (rivers, lakes or coastal waters). Due to their small size and large distribution, the beads are nearly impossible to remove. A 2015 study indicated that one use of a facial scrub containing microbeads may allow anywhere from 4,594 to 94,500 microbeads to enter the environment. Despite their small size, microbeads are harmful to the environment since their properties allow them to readily absorb toxic chemicals and they are capable of bioaccumulating to the highest trophic level, which includes humans.

== State and federal legislation ==
States such as California, New York, and Illinois recognized the damage that plastic microbeads were doing and began to enact statewide and local county bans on microbeads. Their leadership spoke to the United States Congress, as did the support from the many groups who brought to light the harmful effects of microbeads. This motivated bipartisan support to ban microbeads on a federal level.

Along with increasing number of local, city, and state laws across the United States already banning products with microbeads were various business groups, scientists, environmental groups, the fishing industry, the culinary industry, the tourism industry, and even the cosmetics industry that supported the ban on microbeads and encouraged Congress to make the microbead ban a federal law in the United States. Several cosmetics companies were already voluntarily choosing to stop using microbeads in their products.

On March 4, 2015, Representative Frank Pallone (D-New Jersey) introduced the microbead ban to the House. On May 21, 2015 a bill was introduced in the Senate by Senator Kirsten E. Gillibrand (D-New York). The House passed the bill on December 7, 2015. On December 18, 2015, the Senate passed the bill with unanimous consent from both Democratic and Republican parties. President Barack Obama signed the bill on December 28, 2015.

== Exceptions ==
The Act limits the ban solely to "rinse-off" cosmetic products that perform an exfoliating function, such as toothpaste or face wash. Other products are not included, for example, other personal care products, cleaning products, and make-up. States like California already had strict bans on microbeads that were designed to avoid loopholes that would allow for harmful substitutes, while other states, like Illinois, banned microbeads, but allowed for biodegradable plastic products.

The United States was the first country to ban microbeads, although since then several others have followed suit, including Italy, the United Kingdom, and New Zealand.

The loopholes in the US Microbead-Free Waters Act have become apparent to many other countries, especially in the United Kingdom, which has encouraged them to enact strict bans that will avoid all loopholes.

== Substitute products ==
There are many economically feasible substitutes for plastic microbeads that do not leach toxins and will not contaminate waterways. Some of these include beeswax, shells, nuts, seeds, and sand which are naturally occurring, biodegradable, and are already being used in numerous personal care products.

== See also ==
- Plastic pollution
- Plastic resin pellet pollution
