= Syntactic foam =

Composite material filled with low-density spheres

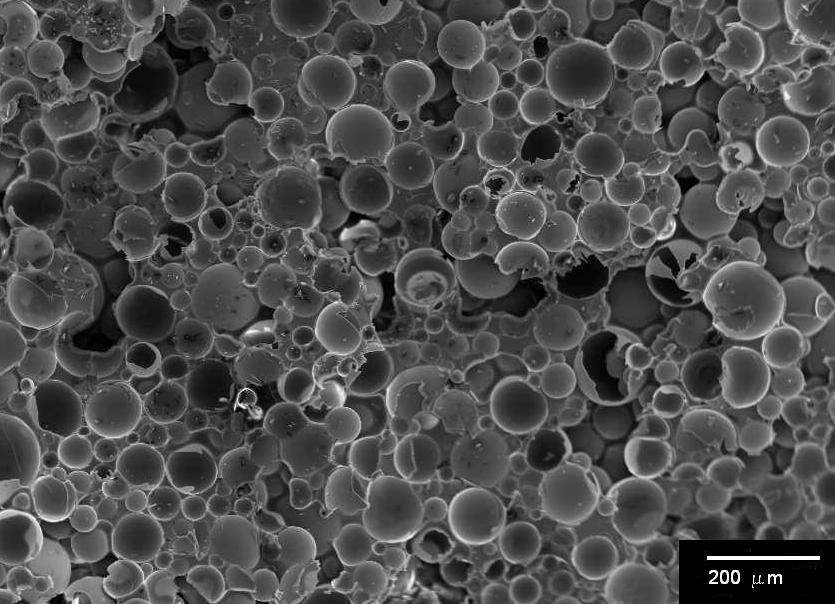
Syntactic foam, shown by scanning electron microscopy, consisting of glass microspheres within a matrix of epoxy resin

Syntactic foams are composite materials synthesized by filling a metal, polymer, cementitious or ceramic matrix with spheres as aggregates. The spheres may be hollow, called microballoons or cenospheres, or non-hollow, for example perlite. In this context, "syntactic" means "put together." The presence of hollow particles results in lower density, higher specific strength (strength divided by density), lower coefficient of thermal expansion, and, in some cases, radar or sonar transparency.

== History ==
The term was originally coined by the Bakelite Company, in 1955, for their lightweight composites made of hollow phenolic microspheres bonded to a matrix of phenolic, epoxy, or polyester.

These materials were developed in early 1960s as improved buoyancy materials for marine applications. Other characteristics led these materials to aerospace and ground transportation vehicle applications.

== Characteristics ==
Tailorability is one of the biggest advantages of these materials. The matrix material can be selected from almost any metal, polymer, or ceramic. Microballoons are available in a variety of sizes and materials, including glass microspheres, cenospheres, carbon, and polymers. The most widely used and studied foams are glass microspheres (in epoxy or polymers), and cenospheres or ceramics (in aluminium). One can change the volume fraction of microballoons or use microballoons of different effective density, the latter depending on the average ratio between the inner and outer radii of the microballoons.

A manufacturing method for low density syntactic foams is based on the principle of buoyancy.

=== Strength ===
The compressive properties of syntactic foams, in most cases, strongly depend on the properties of the filler particle material. In general, the compressive strength of the material is proportional to its density. Cementitious syntactic foams are reported to achieve compressive strength values greater than 30 MPa (4.4 ksi) while maintaining densities lower than 1.2 g/cm^{3} (0.69 oz/cu in).

The matrix material has more influence on the tensile properties. Tensile strength may be highly improved by a chemical surface treatment of the particles, such as silanization, which allows the formation of strong bonds between glass particles and epoxy matrix. Addition of fibrous materials can also increase the tensile strength.

== Applications ==
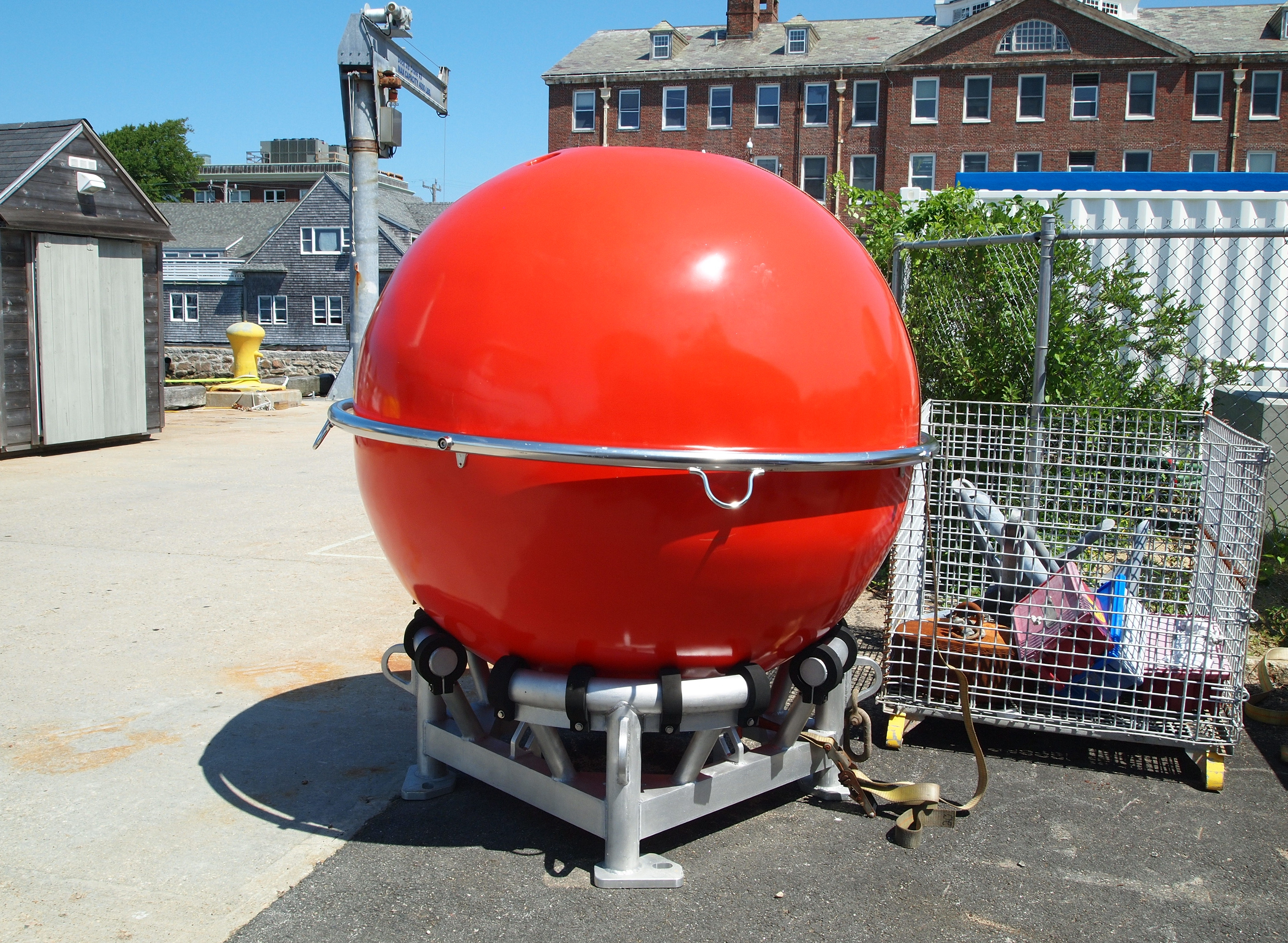
Syntactic foam sphere used as a subsurface float in oceanographic mooring.

Current applications for syntactic foam include buoyancy modules for marine riser tensioners, remotely operated underwater vehicles (ROVs), autonomous underwater vehicles (AUVs), deep-sea exploration, boat hulls, and helicopter and airplane components.

Cementitious syntactic foams have also been investigated as a potential lightweight structural composite material. These materials include glass microspheres dispersed in a cement paste matrix to achieve a closed cell foam structure, instead of a metallic or a polymeric matrix. Cementitious syntactic foams have also been tested for their mechanical performance under high strain rate loading conditions to evaluate their energy dissipation capacity in crash cushions, blast walls, etc. Under these loading conditions, the glass microspheres of the cementitious syntactic foams did not show progressive crushing. Ultimately, unlike the polymeric and metallic syntactic foams, they did not emerge as suitable materials for energy dissipation applications. Structural applications of syntactic foams include use as the intermediate layer (that is, the core) of sandwich panels.

Though the cementitious syntactic foams demonstrate superior specific strength values in comparison to most conventional cementitious materials, it is challenging to manufacture them. Generally, the hollow inclusions tend to buoy and segregate in the low shear strength and high-density fresh cement paste. Therefore, maintaining a uniform microstructure across the material must be achieved through a strict control of the composite rheology. In addition, certain glass types of microspheres may lead to an alkali silica reaction. Therefore, the adverse effects of this reaction must be considered and addressed to ensure the long-term durability of these composites.

Other applications include;

- Deep-sea buoyancy foams. A method of creating submarine hulls by 3D printing was developed in 2018.
- Thermoforming plug assist
- Radar transparent materials
- Acoustically attenuating materials
- Cores for sandwich composites
- Blast mitigating materials
- Sporting goods such as bowling balls, tennis rackets, and soccer balls.
