= Plastic Soup Foundation =

Non-governmental organization

- Formation: 2011; 15 years ago
- Type: Non-governmental Organisation
- Purpose: Marine conservation
- Location: Amsterdam, Netherlands
- Methods: Advocacy, Education, Innovation
- Website: plasticsoupfoundation.org

Plastic Soup Foundation is a non-profit marine conservation organisation that aims to reduce plastic pollution, specifically marine plastic pollution. Established in 2011, Plastic Soup Foundation advocates towards imposing bans or voluntary phase-outs of microbeads in cosmetics at a global scale with the Beat the Microbead campaign.

== Projects ==
=== Beat the Microbead campaign ===
Initiated in 2012, the campaign has raised awareness and engaged people, cosmetic manufacturers and governing institutions on the issue of microbeads. Since the campaign, 15 countries have taken steps to ban microbeads. Beat the Microbead has introduced an app that detects over 500 microplastic ingredients to be used as a tool by customers to recognize and avoid products containing microbeads, while also creating a database. The project has introduced a "Zero Plastic Inside" logo to incentivize and recognize manufacturers who use eco-friendly alternatives to microbeads in their products.

=== Ocean Clean Wash campaign ===
Since 2016, Ocean Clean Wash aims to reduce synthetic fiber pollution by 80% in the coming years by stimulating and promoting innovative solutions to microfiber filters and exerting pressure on clothing and washing machine manufacturers to develop products that prevent the flow of fibers to the water systems. The campaign has developed a new methodology and benchmark for fashion and textile brands to get their clothes tested for the amount of microfiber release whereby tested items will be assigned a label according to the release.

=== Plastic Health Coalition ===
Plastic Soup Foundation initiated a partnership between national and environmental and research organisations to encourage further research into the human health impacts of plastic.

=== Education ===
Plastic Soup Foundation has developed a scanning method called the Plastic Soup Footprint where companies can measure their plastic footprint. The organisation holds inventor competitions to find innovation solutions for plastic pollution such as The Young Plastic Pollution Challenge. The organisation also published teaching materials and conduct guest lecturers on plastic pollution in education institutes.
