= Crowley Maritime =

American transportation and logistics company

Crowley Maritime Corporation

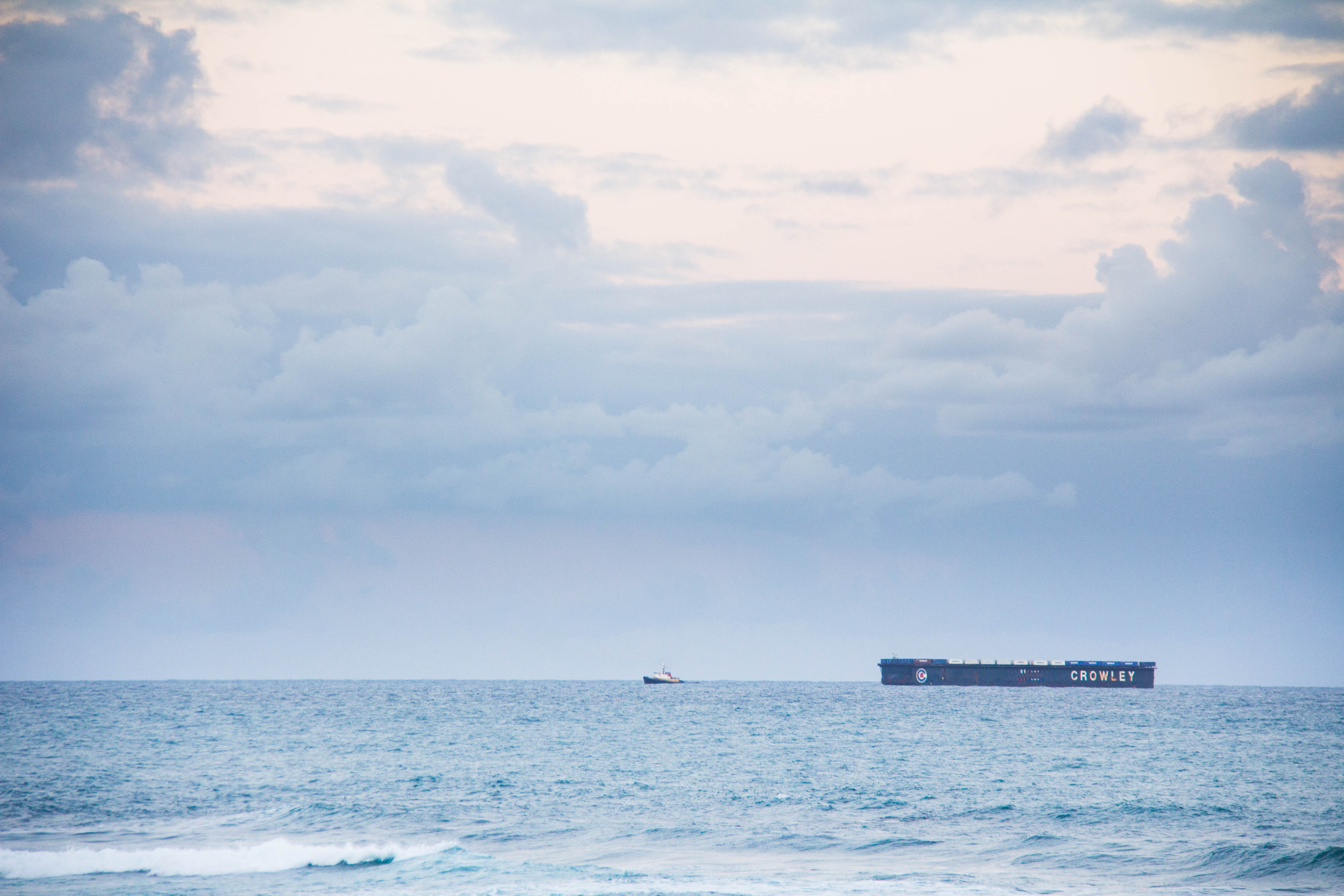
- Crowley vessel seen from the shores of Puerto Rico
- Type: Private
- Founded: 1892; 134 years ago in San Francisco
- Founder: Thomas Crowley
- Headquarters: Jacksonville, Florida, U.S.
- Services: Transportation, logistics
- Revenue: US$3.5 billion (2023)
- Number of employees: 7,000
- Website: www.crowley.com

Crowley Maritime Corporation is an American transportation and logistics company based in Jacksonville, Florida.

As of July 2016, Crowley was ranked as the 13th largest private company in Florida, employing approximately 5,300 people worldwide with revenues of $2.2 billion. It provides its services using a fleet of more than 300 vessels, consisting of RO-RO vessels, LO-LO vessels, tankers, Articulated Tug-Barges (ATBs), tugs and barges. Crowley's land-based facilities and equipment include terminals, warehouses, tank farms, and specialized vehicles. The company also provides the Thomas B. Crowley Sr. Memorial Scholarship each year to exceptional maritime students.

== History ==
Crowley was founded in 1892 when founder Thomas Crowley, purchased an 18-foot Whitehall Rowboat to provide transportation of personnel and supplies to ships anchored on San Francisco Bay.

The company was incorporated under the name Thomas Crowley and Brothers in the later 1890s and within a few years, services broadened to include bay wing and ship assistance services.

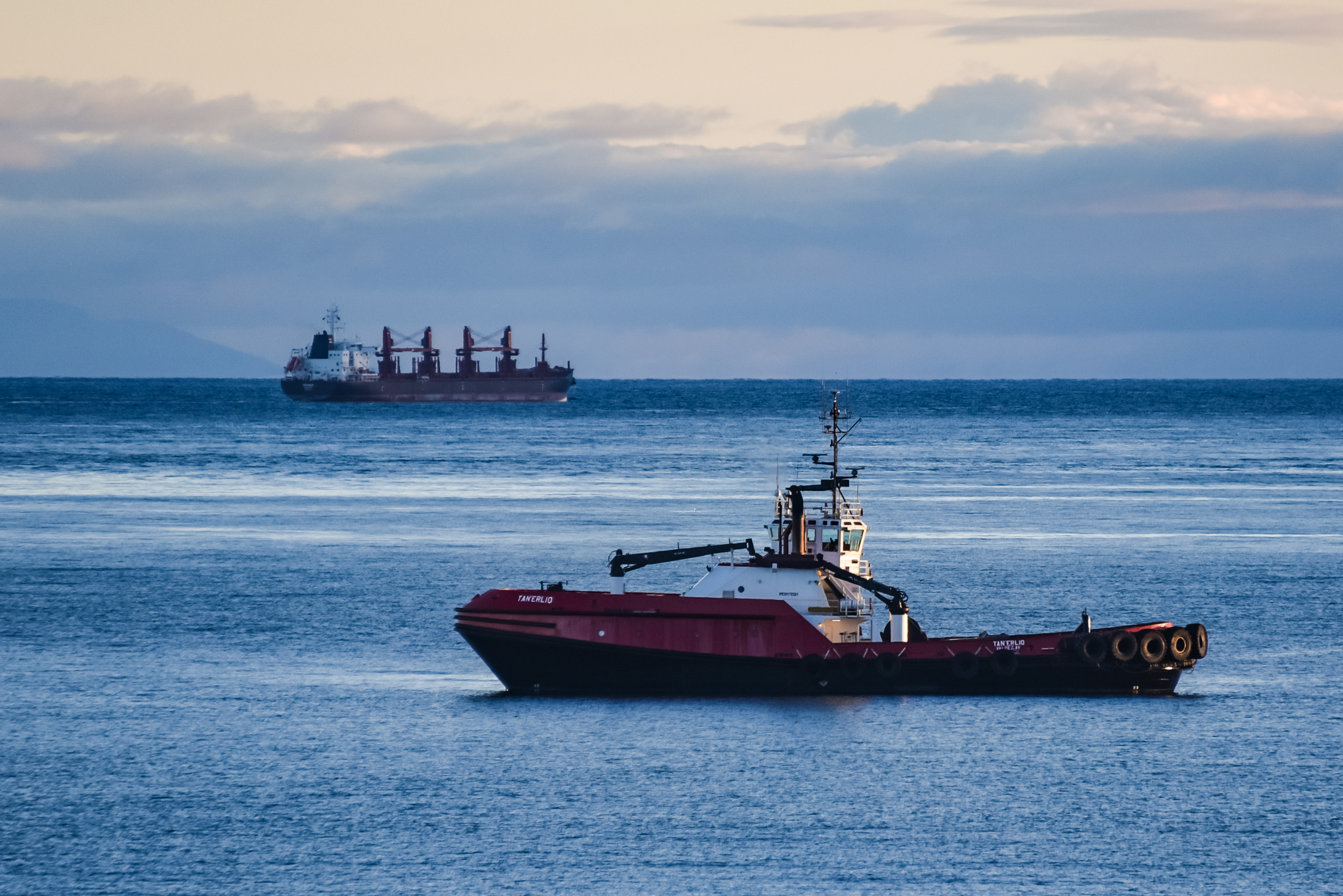
Crowley Maritime oceangoing tugboat, Tanerliq, anchored off Port Angeles, Washington, is used as a ship escort and for rescue and oil response.

In mid-1994, following the passing of his father, Thomas B. Crowley, Jr. was elected president, chairman of the board, and chief executive officer.

In 2010, following the 7.0 Haiti earthquake that affected more than 3 million people and caused major damage in Port-au-Prince, Crowley (working under contract with the United States Transportation Command (USTRANSCOM)), re-established cargo operations in Haiti, allowing humanitarian relief from multiple shippers to enter the country. Crowley and its employees then donated $80,000 to the American Red Cross in support of Haiti relief efforts and transported an estimated 15,000 emergency housing units to the island.

In Dec. 2010, Crowley's Alaska fuel sales and distribution enterprise added eight Shell Oil service stations to its wholesale network. Under the agreement, Crowley had responsibility for the wholesale purchases of Shell motor fuel and transporting, distributing and selling the fuel to 17 independently owned and operated sites in Alaska.

In 2018, VT Halter Maritime delivered the first of two Commitment Class, LNG-powered Combination RORO (ConRo) ships, the El Coquí. The ship measures 219.5m long with a 26,500 deadweight tons. It can transport up to 2,400 TEU at a cruising speed of 22 knots. The Coquí sister ship, Taino, was delivered in January 2019.

In 2024, the company took delivery of the first U.S. all electric tug boat, eWolf. That same year, Crowley and SEACOR Holdings create standalone company.

== Acquisitions ==
- Marine Transport Corporation, a petroleum and chemical transportation company, was acquired in 2001.
- In 2002, the company purchased Speed Cargo Services, a non-vessel operating common carrier (NVOCC). A year later, in 2003, Apparel Transportation, a Central America logistics services provider to the apparel industry was purchased for an undisclosed amount.
- Crowley acquired the fuel distribution assets of Northland Fuel, LLC in 2005, which consisted of Yukon Fuel Company and Service Oil and Gas. The company also purchased Titan Maritime LLC.
- In 2008, the company purchased Seattle-based Naval Architecture & Marine Engineering firm, Jensen Maritime Consultants.
- Customized Brokers, a Miami-based customs clearance company specializing in perishable, refrigerated cargoes was purchased by Crowley in 2009.
- Crowley acquired Miami, Florida-based SeaFreight Agencies in October 2015.
- Tamarind Consolidated was purchased by the company in 2023.

== Notable incidents ==
September 21, 2011

On September 21, 2011 a Crowley Maritime barge carrying 140,000 gallons of aviation fuel and 5,800 gallons of gasoline broke away from a tugboat during rough seas near the western coast of Alaska. Control of the barge was regained later that afternoon.

March 10, 2025

On March 10, 2025, the MV Stena Immaculate, an oil tanker managed by Crowley, was involved in the 2025 North Sea ship collision. The Immaculate was at anchor in the North Sea, off the coast of East Yorkshire, when it was hit by the Portuguese-flagged container ship MV Solong. Multiple explosions were reported and the ship was engulfed by fire, but all of the Immaculate's crew were reported rescued.
