= Plastic pellet pollution =

Marine debris from plastic manufacturing particles

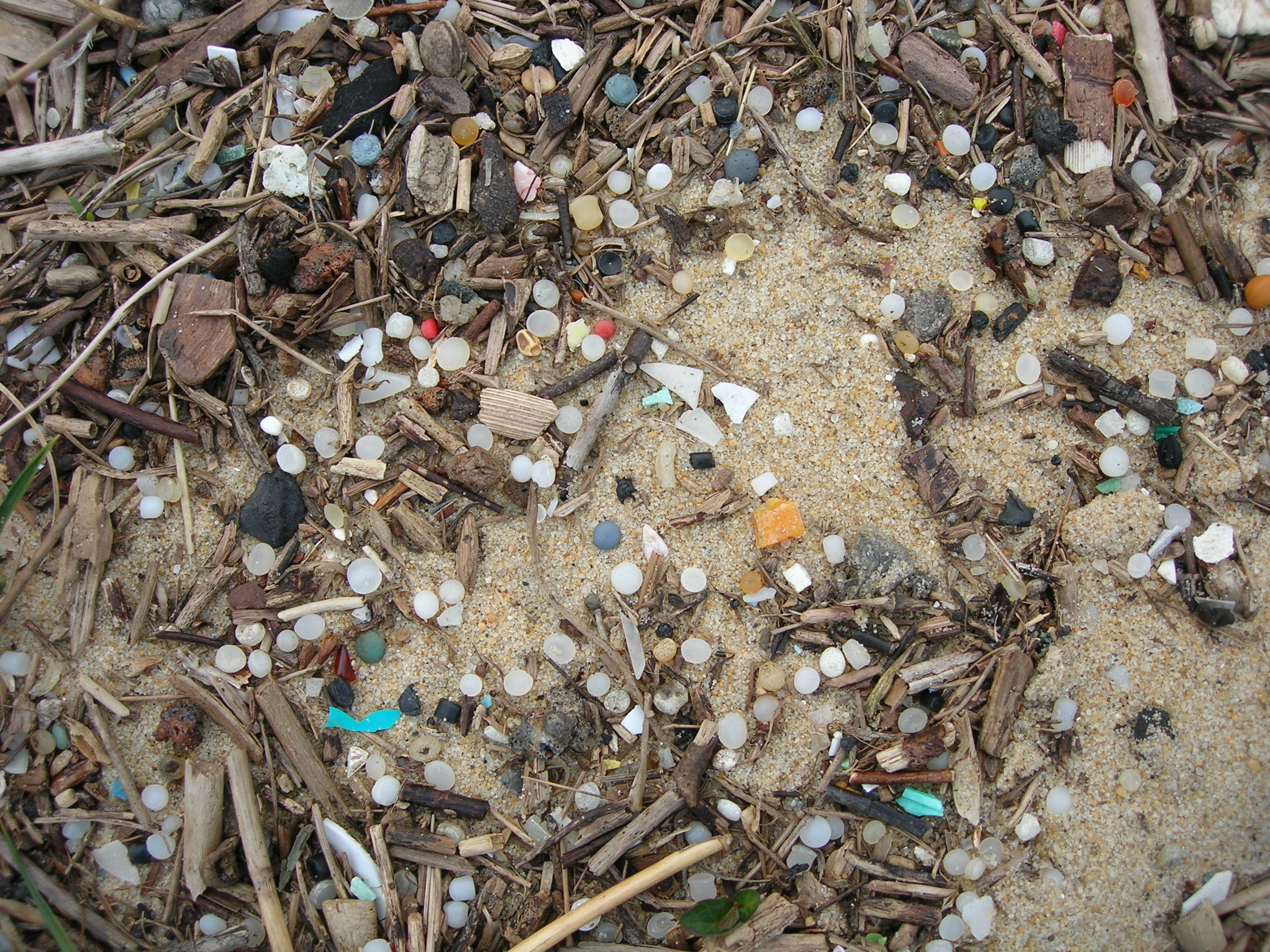
Plastic "nurdle" pellets on a beach in southwest France, 2011

Plastic pellet pollution is a type of marine debris originating from the plastic particles that are universally used to manufacture large-scale plastics. In the context of plastic pollution, these pre-production plastic pellets are sometimes known as "nurdles". These microplastics are created separately from the user plastics they are melted down to form, and pellet loss can occur during both the manufacturing and transport stages. When released into the open environment, they create persistent pollution both in the oceans and on beaches. About 230,000 tonnes of nurdles are thought to be deposited in the oceans each year, where they are often mistaken for food by seabirds, fish and other wildlife. Due to their small size, they are notoriously difficult to clear up from beaches and elsewhere.

== Description ==
Nurdles are the second largest source of microplastics in the ocean. Approximately 27 million tonnes (60 billion pounds) of nurdles are manufactured annually in the United States. One pound of pelletized HDPE contains approximately 25,000 nurdles (approximately 20 mg per nurdle). They are typically under 5 mm (0.20 in) in diameter. Worldwide, about 230,000 tonnes of nurdles are thought to be deposited in the oceans each year.

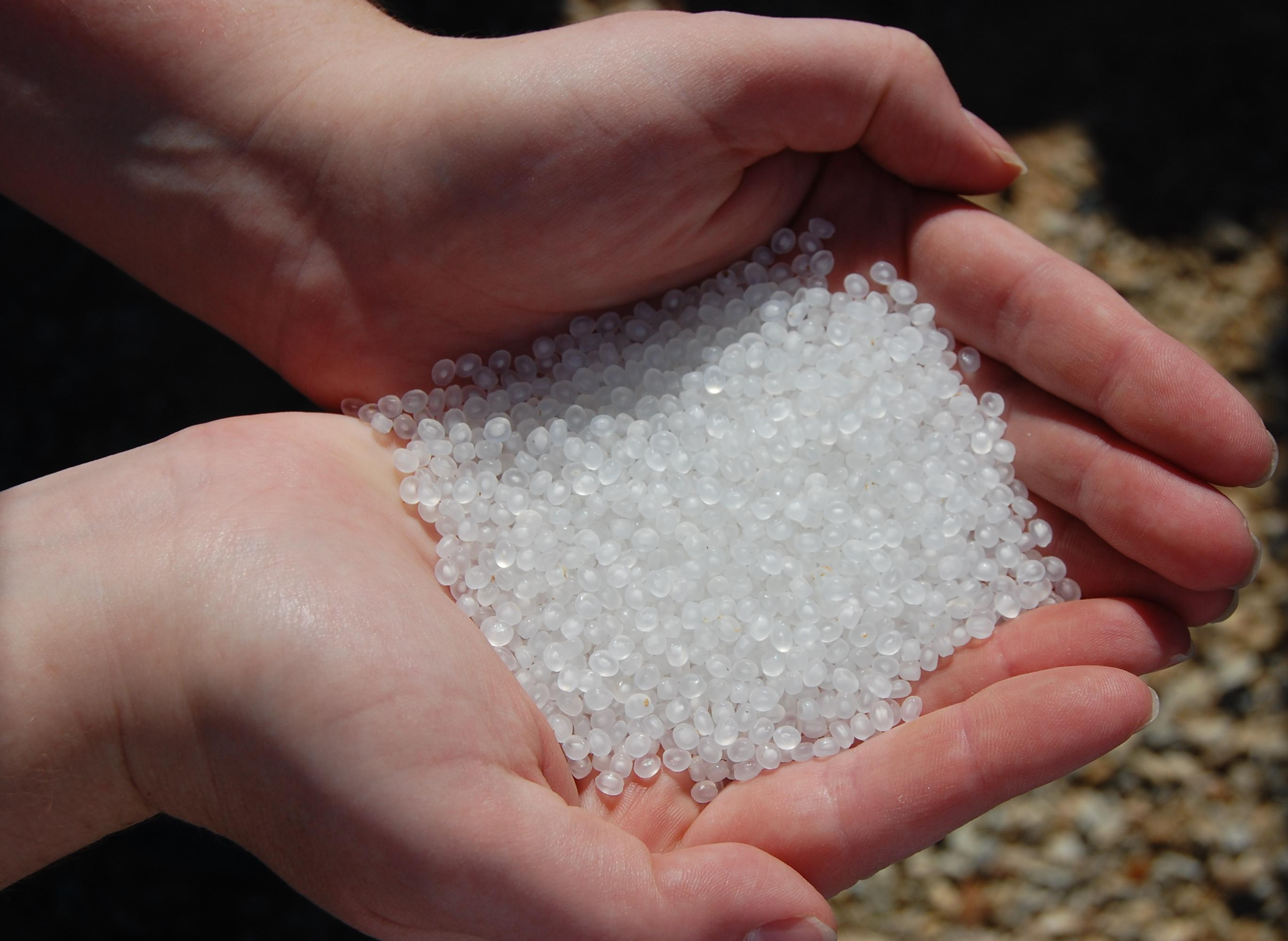
A handful of nurdles, spilled from a train in Pineville, Louisiana, in the United States

Plastic resin pellets are classified as primary microplastics, meaning that they were intentionally produced at sizes ranging from 1–5 mm in diameter (whereas secondary microplastics are created through photodegradation and weathering of larger pieces of plastic, like water bottles and fishing nets). Primary microplastics make up between 15% and 31% of the growing amount of marine microplastic pollution, which is related to the corporative expansion of large-scale plastic production. Like microbeads, preproduction plastic pellets can be released directly into the environment as a form of primary microplastic pollution. As more plastic is being produced, more plastic pellets are being deposited in waterways.

A study on a polyethylene production facility in Sweden found that between 3 and 36 million plastic pellets enter the environment from production sites every year. These nurdles spill during transportation and production and due to inadequate precautions and regulations, millions of pellets of plastic end up in nearby waterways and eventually the ocean.

== Environmental impact ==
Nurdles are a major contributor to marine debris. During a three-month study of Orange County beaches researchers found them to be the most common beach contaminant. Nurdles on bathing beaches in East Lothian, Scotland have been shown to be covered with E. coli and Vibrio biofilms, according to a 2019 study.

Waterborne nurdles may either be a raw material of plastic production, or from larger chunks of plastics. A major concentration of plastic may be the Great Pacific Garbage Patch, a growing collection of marine debris known for its high concentrations of plastic litter.

Nurdles that escape from the plastic production process into waterways or oceans have become a significant source of ocean and beach plastic pollution. Plastic pellet pollution that has been monitored in studies is mainly found in the sediments and beach areas and is usually polyethylene or polypropylene, the two main plastic polymers found in microplastic pollution.

Nurdles have frequently been found in the digestive tracts of various marine creatures, causing physiological damage by leaching plasticizers such as phthalates. Nurdles can carry two types of micropollutants in the marine environment: native plastic additives and hydrophobic pollutants absorbed from seawater. For example, concentrations of PCBs and DDE on nurdles collected from Japanese coastal waters were found to be up to 1 million times higher than the levels detected in surrounding seawater.

Plastic microbeads used in cosmetic exfoliating products are also found in water.

== Incidents ==
=== 2012 ===
San Francisco Bay Coastal Cleanup from multiple nurdle spills.

In Hong Kong, after being blown by Typhoon Vicente on 24 July 2012, some containers belonging to Chinese oil giant Sinopec which were carrying over 150 tonnes of plastic pellets were blown into the sea, washing up on southern Hong Kong coasts, such as Shek O, Cheung Chau, Ma Wan and Lamma Island. Though nurdles are not toxic or hazardous on their own according to Sinopec, the spill disrupted marine life and is being credited with killing stocks of fish on fish farms.

=== 2017 ===
A nurdle spill of about two billion nurdles (49 tons) from a shipping container in Durban Harbor required extended cleanup efforts. These nurdles have also been spotted washing up on the shore in Western Australia.

The Great Nurdle Hunt, which occurred June 2–5, 2017, across the United Kingdom drew attention to the issue of plastic pellet pollution. A program started by Fidra, a Scottish environmental charity, sourced information on nurdles from citizens across the region using shared photos to better understand the makeup of pollution across beaches in the UK. The nurdle hunts occurring earlier in 2017 determined that 73% of UK beaches had nurdle pollution.

=== 2018 ===
A semi-truck crash led to the release of bright blue colored nurdles into Pocono Creek and the waterways of the Lehigh Valley, Pennsylvania.

=== 2019 ===
In January 2019 the container vessel MSC Zoe lost more than 300 containers in the North Sea, leading to pollution of nearby islands, including pollution by plastic pellets.

=== 2020 ===
On February 23, 2020, the Trans Carrier ship, traveling from Rotterdam (Netherlands) to Stavanger (Norway), encountered severe weather conditions off the Danish coast. As a result, a container carrying polypropylene pellets sustained damage. Approximately 13.2 tonnes of nurdles, out of the 26 tonnes originally aboard the Trans Carrier at the time of the incident, were released into the North Sea. This spill led to contamination in the Oslo Fjord and along the Swedish west coast, impacting about 700 coastal sites.

During a thunderstorm on August 20, a 40-foot (12 m) shipping container with 25 tons of nurdles arriving from Asia fell off the CMA CGM Bianca ship into the Mississippi River in New Orleans. No official clean up took place. Hazardous material spills are in coast guard jurisdiction, but nurdles are not classified as hazardous material. The Department of Environmental Quality does not find it clear as to who is responsible for cleaning up the spill.

=== 2021 ===
On 2 June 2021 the cargo ship X-Press Pearl sank off the coast of Sri Lanka, spilling chemicals and microplastic nurdles and causing the worst environmental disaster in the country's history.

=== 2023 ===
In January 2023, the French government announced it will be taking legal action against "persons unknown" in response to extensive plastic pellet pollution along the coast of Brittany that is thought to have originated from shipping containers lost in the Atlantic Ocean.

Since December 2023, the coast of Galicia is facing an environmental crisis due to millions of tiny white plastic balls from the Liberian-flagged ship Toconao, which lost six containers off Viana do Castelo in Portugal.

=== 2025 ===
Nurdles were found on the North East coast in England in March 2025 after a collision between cargo ship Solong and tanker Stena Immaculate.

=== 2026 ===
Nurdles were again found on the North East coast in England in July 2026 after a collision between a vessel and a ship container at the Port of Tyne. More than a billion nurdles were released in what is thought to be the biggest spill in Northern Europe.

== Current progress and solutions ==
Of the 300 million tons of plastic material produced each year, over 14 million tons end up in the ocean, and plastic production is continuing to increase. Marine litter as a whole is imposing environmental threats to marine ecosystems and policy solutions are crucial to better the ocean.

- The plastic industry has responded to the increased interest and concern for plastic pellet loss and pollution sources. Operation Clean Sweep was created by SPI: The Plastics Industry Trade Association in 2001 and joined by the American Chemistry Council with the goal of zero pellet loss for plastic manufacturers. This voluntary stewardship program provides its members with a manual which guides them through ways in which they can reduce pellet loss within their own facilities and provides the necessary training. However, the program does not require companies to keep or report any data on pellet spills.
- In 2007 California passed AB 258, which established measures that preproduction plastic producing manufacturers had to follow during the production and transport of plastic pellets. This preventative measure includes inspections by the Regional and State Water Board staff and enforcement of orderly production and transportation of preproduction plastic to minimize the amount of plastic resin pellets spills.
- In 2008, California passed a "nurdle law", which "specifically names pre-production plastic pellets (nurdles) as a pollutant".
- In 2015, the Microbead-Free Waters Act passed, which prohibits the manufacturing and distribution of primary plastic microbeads for cosmetic products. This ban will reduce the amount of plastic pellets that end up in oceans by preventing microbead particles from being used in cosmetic care products.

== Actions for creating awareness ==
On April 11, 2013, in order to create awareness, artist Maria Cristina Finucci founded The Garbage Patch State at UNESCO in Paris in front of Director General Irina Bokova. It is the first of a series of events under the patronage of UNESCO and of Italian Ministry of the Environment.

The Great Nurdle Hunt is a citizen science project that maps out plastic pellet pollution globally. The data collected is used to actively engage with industry and policy-makers to develop solutions to prevent further pellet pollution.

Judith Selby Lang and Richard Lang as One Beach Plastic engage in wide range of artistic disruptions with the intent to bring awareness to the effects of plastic pollution on the world's beaches. Many of their works specifically address nurdle pollution.

== See also ==
- Microbead
- Microplastics
- Plastic pollution
