= Cenosphere =

Hollow sphere made largely of silica and alumina and filled with gas

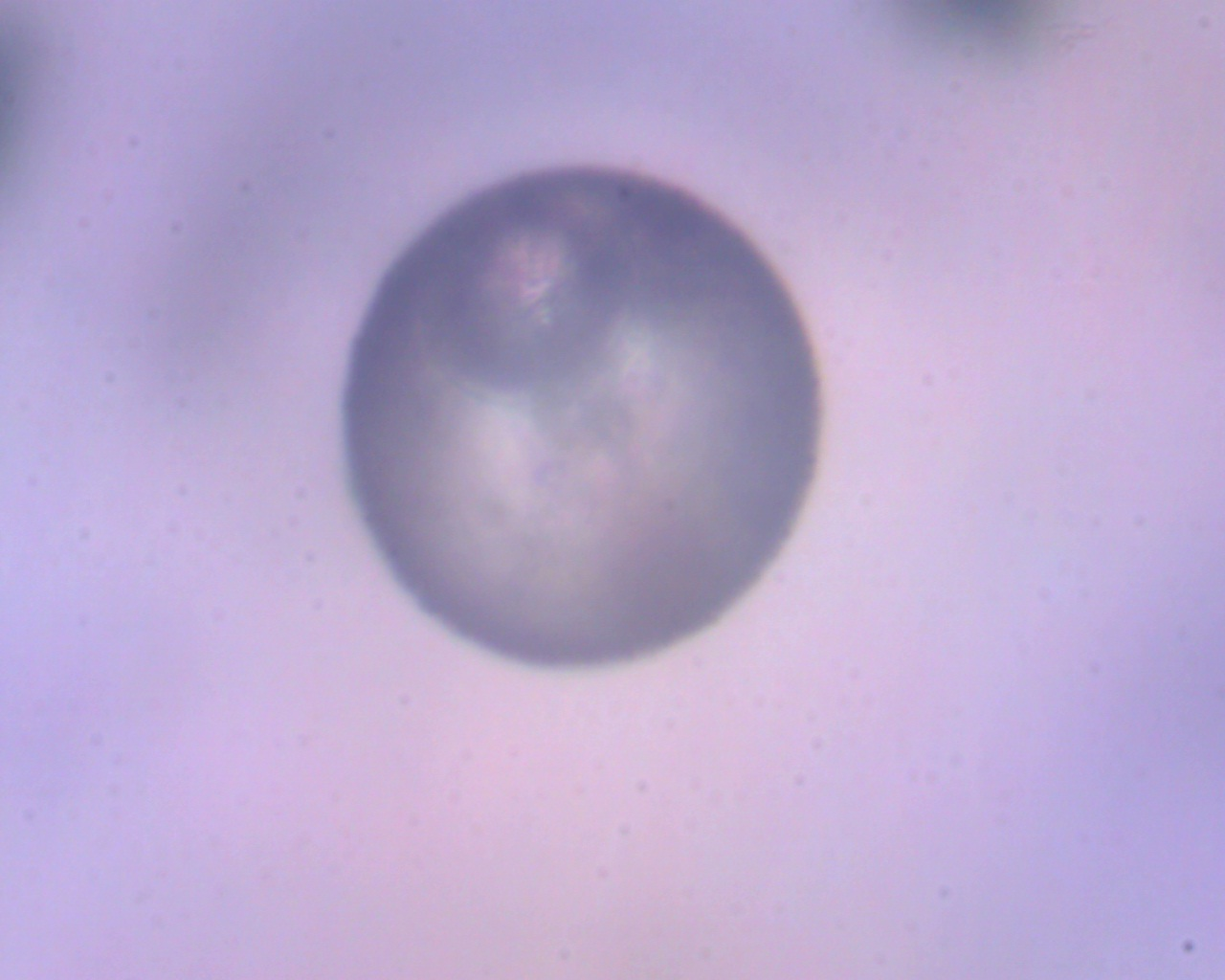
Cenosphere formed from coal combustion, magnified 400×

A cenosphere or kenosphere is a lightweight, inert, hollow sphere made largely of silica and alumina and filled with air or inert gas, typically produced as a coal combustion byproduct at thermal power plants. The color of cenospheres varies from gray to almost white and their density is about 0.4–0.8 g/cm^{3} (0.014–0.029 lb/cu in), which gives them a great buoyancy.

Cenospheres are hard and rigid, light, waterproof and insulative. This makes them highly useful in a variety of products, notably fillers.

== Etymology ==
The word cenosphere or kenosphere is derived from two Greek words, κενός (kenos: hollow, empty) and σφαίρα (sphaira: sphere), literally meaning "hollow sphere."

== Production ==
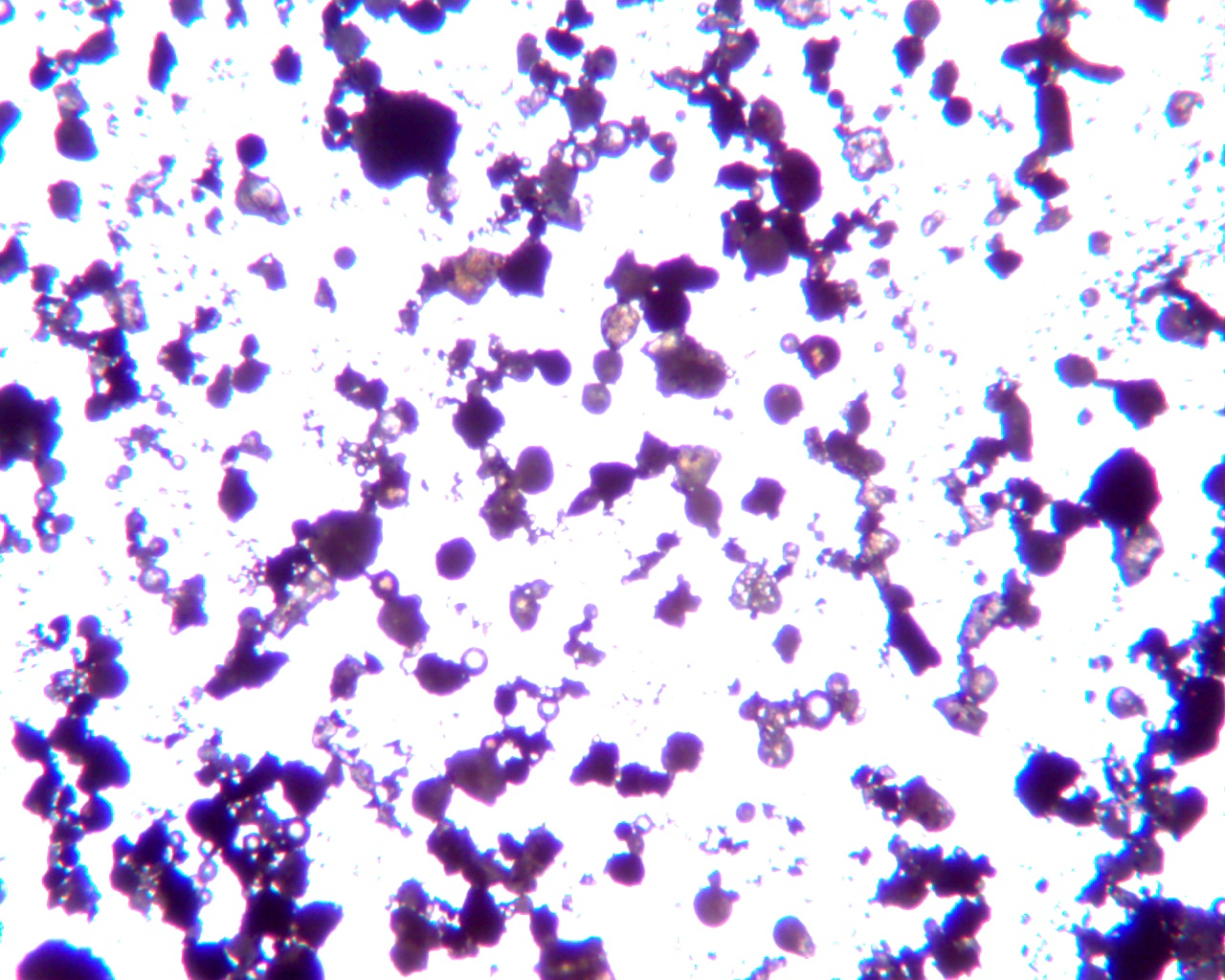
Fly ash sample containing ceramic cenospheres, magnified 40×

The process of burning coal in thermal power plants produces fly ash containing ceramic particles made largely of alumina and silica. They are produced at temperatures of 1,500 to 1,750 °C (2,730 to 3,180 °F) through complicated chemical and physical transformation. Their chemical composition and structure varies considerably depending on the composition of coal that generated them.

The ceramic particles in fly ash have three types of structures. The first type of particles are solid and are called precipitator. The second type of particles are hollow and are called cenospheres. The third type of particles are called plerospheres, which are hollow particles of large diameter filled with smaller size precipitator and cenospheres.

=== Fuel or oil cenospheres ===
The definition of cenosphere has changed over the last 30 years. Up until the 1990s it was limited to a largely carbonaceous sphere caused by the oxygen-deficient combustion of a liquid fuel droplet that was cooled below 200 °C (392 °F) before it was consumed. These fuel cenospheres indicated a combustion source using injected droplets of fuel or the open burning of heavy liquid fuels such as asphalt or a thermoplastic material that were bubbling as they burned; the bursting of the bubbles created airborne droplets of fuel. This is still a common definition used in environmental microscopy to differentiate between the inefficient combustion of liquid fuels and the high-temperature fly ash resulting from the efficient combustion of fuels with inorganic contaminants. Fuel cenospheres are always black.

The refractory cenosphere as defined above is synonymous with microballoons or glass microspheres and excludes the traditional fuel cenospheres definition. The use of the term cenosphere in place of microballoons is widespread, and it has become an additional definition.

== Applications ==
Cenospheres are now used as fillers in cement to produce low-density concrete. A 2016 article reports that some manufacturers have begun filling metals and polymers with cenospheres to make lightweight composite materials with higher strength than other types of foam materials. Such composite materials are called syntactic foam. Aluminium-based syntactic foams are finding applications in the automotive sector.

Silver-coated cenospheres are used in conductive coatings, tiles, and fabrics. Another use is in conductive paints for antistatic coatings and electromagnetic shielding.

- Syntactic foam
- Cores of sandwich structure
- Removal of nitrogen oxides
- Dry reforming of methane

== See also ==
- Cenocell – Concrete material using fly ash in place of cement
- Fly ash – By-products of coal combustion
- Glass microsphere – Microscopic spheres
- Microbead (research) – Uniform polymer particles
