= Glass microsphere =

Microscopic spheres

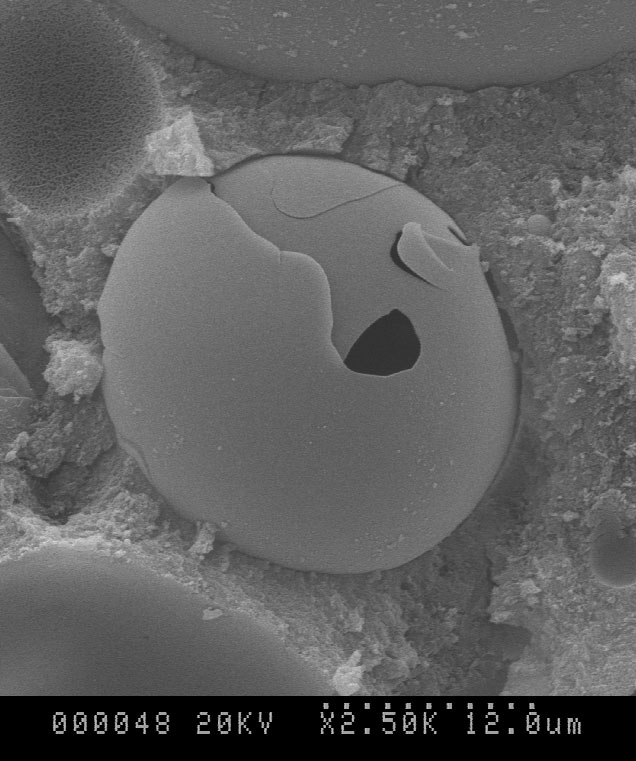
SEM micrograph of a glass microsphere in concrete

Glass microspheres are microscopic spheres of glass manufactured for a wide variety of uses in research, medicine, consumer goods and various industries. Glass microspheres are usually between 1 and 1000 micrometers in diameter, although the sizes can range from 100 nanometers to 5 millimeters in diameter. Hollow glass microspheres, sometimes termed microballoons or glass bubbles, have diameters ranging from 10 to 300 micrometers.

Hollow spheres are used as a lightweight filler in composite materials such as syntactic foam and lightweight concrete. Microballoons give syntactic foam its light weight, low thermal conductivity, and a resistance to compressive stress that far exceeds that of other foams. These properties are exploited in the hulls of submersibles and deep-sea oil drilling equipment, where other types of foam would implode. Hollow spheres of other materials create syntactic foams with different properties: ceramic balloons e.g. can make a light syntactic aluminium foam.

Hollow spheres also have uses ranging from storage and slow release of pharmaceuticals and radioactive tracers to research in controlled storage and release of hydrogen. Microspheres are also used in composites to fill polymer resins for specific characteristics such as weight, sandability and sealing surfaces. When making surfboards for example, shapers seal the EPS foam blanks with epoxy and microballoons to create an impermeable and easily sanded surface upon which fiberglass laminates are applied.

Glass microspheres can be made by heating tiny droplets of dissolved water glass in a process known as ultrasonic spray pyrolysis (USP), and properties can be improved somewhat by using a chemical treatment to remove some of the sodium. Sodium depletion has also allowed hollow glass microspheres to be used in chemically sensitive resin systems, such as long pot life epoxies or non-blown polyurethane composites.

Additional functionalities, such as silane coatings, are commonly added to the surface of hollow glass microspheres to increase the matrix/microspheres interfacial strength (the common failure point when stressed in a tensile manner).

Microspheres made of high-quality optical glass, can be produced for research on the field of optical resonators or cavities.

Glass microspheres are also produced as waste product in coal-fired power stations. In this case the product would be generally termed "cenosphere" and carry an aluminosilicate chemistry (as opposed to the sodium silica chemistry of engineered spheres). Small amounts of silica in the coal are melted and as they rise up the chimneystack, expand and form small hollow spheres. These spheres are collected together with the ash, which is pumped in a water mixture to the resident ash dam. Some of the particles do not become hollow and sink in the ash dams, while the hollow ones float on the surface of the dams. They become a nuisance, especially when they dry, as they become airborne and blow over into surrounding areas.

== Application ==
Microspheres have been used to produce focal regions, known as photonic nanojets and whose sizes are large enough to support internal resonances, but at the same time small enough, so that geometrical optics cannot be applied for studying their properties. Previous research has demonstrated experimentally and with simulations the use of microspheres in order to increase the signal intensity obtained in different experiments. A confirmation of the photonic jet in the microwave scale, observing the backscattering enhancement that occurred when metallic particles were introduced in the focus area. A measurable enhancement of the backscattered light in the visible range was obtained when a gold nanoparticle was placed inside the photonic nanojet region produced by a dielectric microsphere with a 4.4 μm diameter. A use of nanojets produced by transparent microspheres in order to excite optical active materials, under upconversion processes with different numbers of excitation photons, has been analyzed as well.

Monodisperse glass microspheres have high sphericity and a very tight particle size distribution, often with CV<10% and specification of >95% of particles in size range. Monodisperse glass particles are often used as spacers in adhesives and coatings, such as bond line spacers in epoxies. Just a small amount of spacer grade monodisperse microspheres can create a controlled gap, as well as define and maintain specified bond line thickness. Spacer grade particles can also be used as calibration standards and tracer particles for qualifying medical devices. High quality spherical glass microspheres are often used in gas plasma displays, automotive mirrors, electronic displays, flip chip technology, filters, microscopy, and electronic equipment.

Other applications include syntactic foams and particulate composites and reflective paints.

== Dispensing of microspheres ==
Dispensing of microspheres can be a difficult task. When utilizing microspheres as a filler for standard mixing and dispensing machines, a breakage rate of up to 80% can occur, depending upon factors such as pump choice, material viscosity, material agitation, and temperature. Customized dispensers for microsphere-filled materials may reduce the microsphere breakage rate to a minimal amount. A progressive cavity pump is the pump of choice for dispensing materials with microspheres, which can reduce microsphere breakage as much as 80%.

== See also ==
- Hydrogen storage
