= Gustav Gaudernack =

Norwegian scientist

- Born: 1943 (age 82–83)
- Citizenship: Norway
- Known for: Cancer immunotherapy research

Gustav Gaudernack (born 1943) is a scientist working in the development of cancer vaccines and cancer immunotherapy. He has developed various strategies in immunological treatment of cancer. He is involved in several ongoing cellular and immuno-gene therapeutic clinical trials and his research group has put major efforts into the development of various T cell-based immunotherapeutic strategies.

== Biography ==
Gaudernack was born in 1943 and grew up in Sandvika, Norway. His father Rolf was a jeweler and gemologist and his mother Lilly was a gemologist. His younger brother, Christian, followed in the footsteps of the family and became a jeweler. Gustav on the other hand, chose a path in bio-medical science and in particular immunology. Gustav married Marit Ohrø-Bjørnvik (later Marit Gaudernack) in 1973. They had two children: Hans (1983) and Herman (1988).

== The first footsteps in the field of immunology ==
Gaudernack received the cand.real (Master of Science) degree in biochemistry at the University of Oslo (UiO) in 1972. He traveled to the University of Tromsø (UiT) as a visiting fellow the same year together with several scientists from the UiO. In the period 1973-1979, Gaudernack was a research fellow supervised by Hans Prydz at the UiT. He got a position as a research fellow in the group of Kristian Hannestad at the Department of Immunology, UiT (1979–1980) and further continued his work in the group of Rolf Seljeli (1980–1983). During this period he went to the University of Minnesota, USA, and worked as a research fellow for one year (1980–1981). His research these years was focused on mouse myeloma protein λ315. He further became interested in the innate immune system, in particular monocytes, and generated monocyte-specific monoclonal antibodies (ID5) in hybridomas. Inspired by his research and without being instructed, Gustav gave lectures in immunology at the UiT. Gaudernack is greatly interested in art and in parallel to his research at UiT he opened a gallery at the university called Galleri 72.

== The years at the National Hospital, Oslo ==
In 1983, Gaudernack headed south to Oslo and worked in the group of Erik Thorsby at the Institute for Transplantation Immunology at the National Hospital. Together with Frode Vartdal, Gaudernack contributed to the development of cell-isolation systems for tissue-typing based on mono-disperse magnetic beads (Dynabeads) developed by John Ugelstad. There was a great need for fast tissue-typing techniques and the work was performed in collaboration with the biotechnology company Dynal which funded the research. He further generated monoclonal antibodies specific for the hematopoietic stem cell marker, CD34. A joint collaboration with Dynal, the Norwegian Radium Hospital and Baxter resulted in development of an instrument to isolate hematopoietic stem cells in large scale using anti-CD34 mAb coupled to Dynabeads.

== Cancer vaccines; from idea to clinical trials ==
Already during his period at the UiT, the idea of cancer vaccines came to Gaudernack's mind. The fact that cancer cell lines injected into mice were killed by the animal's immune system was fascinating in a time with the development of the cancer immunosurveillance theory and cancer immunoediting hypothesis. At the end of the 1980s the three-dimensional structure of human leukocyte antigen (HLA) molecule was defined in parallel to identification of tumor-specific gene aberrations. In light of these discoveries, Gaudernack positioned himself early in the development of peptide vaccines based on genetic aberrations. One such genetic aberration was mutations in the proto-oncogene Ras subfamily. Together with his team, Gustav was among the first in the world to develop peptide-based cancer vaccines derived from mutated Ras proto-oncogenes. The peptides contain the various mutations that are present in the catalytic site of the Ras protein.

=== Ras peptide vaccines ===
In 1993, five patients with pancreatic cancer received ras peptide vaccines carrying mutations in codon 12. The five patients carried the corresponding Ras mutation and Ras-specific T cell responses were induced in two of the patients. The study demonstrated that specific T cell responses against mutations uniquely harbored in tumor cells can be induced in cancer patients by vaccination.

Furthermore, late stage pancreatic cancer patients from two previous phase I/II clinical studies, which received K-ras derived peptides carrying oncogenic mutations, were followed more than 10 years. This study significantly demonstrated an improved median survival in the patients that received ras peptide vaccines compared to patients in the control group. Long-term immunological memory responses to the vaccines were present in three patients 9 years after the vaccination. Five patients were still alive for more than nine years after vaccination. This is an unexpected clinical outcome for patients with this malignancy.

=== Telomerase peptide vaccines ===
Since ras peptide vaccines had to contain the mutations that was carried in each individual cancer patient, development of a universal cancer vaccine that could be given to patients regardless of their cancer genotype was strongly needed. The enzyme telomerase is highly expressed in >90% of tumors while most normal cells do not express telomerase. The catalytic subunit of telomerase called human telomerase reverse transcriptase (hTERT), represents a potential universal target for cancer immunotherapy. Gaudernack was the first to develop therapeutic cancer vaccines based on immunogenic peptides derived from hTERT.

In 2000, Gaudernack initiated a phase I/II clinical trial in pancreatic cancer patients using an hTERT derived peptide (GV1001). The study showed that the vaccine was well tolerated and significantly induced immune responses. This was a first in man telomerase vaccine and these data formed the basis for an ongoing phase III trial (Telovax) sponsored by Cancer UK.

In 2006, Gaudernack and colleagues published results from a phase I/II clinical trial in patients with non-small cell lung carcinomas (NSCLC). Similarly to the pancreatic cancer trial, the hTERT peptide vaccine showed to be well tolerated and safe. This study demonstrated that NSCLC patients that responded to the vaccine (54% of evaluable patients) had significantly improved survival compared to non-responding patients. Two of the responding patients had complete remission of the disease and are still alive today (in 2006?).

Together with colleagues and industrial partners, Gaudernack is currently running several other clinical trials with hTERT peptides as therapeutic cancer vaccines.

=== Cellular and Immuno-gene therapy of cancer ===
Gaudernack and colleagues became interested in the immunotherapeutic potential of dendritic cells (DCs) and in 2005, Gaudernack's group published results from a phase I/II clinical trial in prostate cancer patients using autologous DCs loaded with tumor mRNA as a vaccine. This study demonstrated that vaccination with autologous DCs transfected with mRNA derived from three prostate cancer cell lines was safe and an improved clinical outcome was significantly related to immune responses against the vaccine.

Furthermore, Gaudernack and colleagues initiated a phase I/II clinical trial for treatment of melanoma with autologous tumor-mRNA transfected DC vaccines. These data clearly demonstrated vaccine-specific immune responses with a broad specter of T cell response against antigens encoded by the tumor-mRNA antigens utilized for transfection.

Gaudernack is strongly involved in several ongoing cellular and immuno-gene therapeutic clinical trials. In addition, Gaudernack's group has put major effort into development of various T cell-based immunotherapeutic strategies which will enter clinical trials during 2011-2012.

=== Cancer stem cells ===
Gaudernack is member of the Cancer Stem Cell Innovation Center (CAST) and part of his group has in the recent years focused on cancer stem cell research. The major goal for these projects is the development of cancer stem cell-specific immunotherapy.

== Project Collaborations ==
=== Industrial partners ===
- HYDRO ASA, Norway
- GEMVAX, Norway
- KAEL-GEMVAX, South-Korea, Norway
- DYNAL AS/INVITROGEN, Norway
- Sartorius CellGenix GmbH, Germany
- GE-Healthcare, Sweden
- Cellectics LVT, MI USA
- Immatics, Germany

=== International partners ===
- Member Nordic Center of Excellence (NCOE) in cancer vaccines (partners at Karolinska, Herlev, Torino, Forli).
- Member ACT (Adoptive Cell Therapy) consortium (other members: Prof Per thor Straten, Center for Cancer Immunotherapy, Herlev, Prof. Ton Schumacher, Department of Immunology, Netherlands Cancer Institute, Amsterdam, the Netherlands, Prof. Niels Ødum Department of Biology, Division of Immunology, The Panum Institute, University of Copenhagen and Adaptimmune Ltd which is located in Oxfordshire, UK).
- Member of EU cancer vaccine/immunotherapy projects EUCAPS, ENACT and CHILDHOPE. Associated member of EU projects ALLOSTEM. Participation in international organizations such as EORTC, Nordic Lymphoma group etc.
- Prof Dolores Schendel, Institute of Molecular Immunology and Clinical Cooperation Group “Immune Monitoring,” Helmholtz Zentrum München. Optimization and GMP adaption of dendritic cell vaccines, maturation cocktails and fast DC. GMP production of mRNA for cancer vaccines against AML.
- Prof. Kris Thielemans, Department of Physiology and Immunology, Medical School of the Vrije Universiteit Brussel.
- Prof Stefaan van Gool, Klinikhoofd Kinder-hamato/neuro-oncologie, Laboratorium voor Experimentele Immunologie, Leuven. Clinical collaboration on development and clinical trial of DC vaccine for brain tumours.
- Prof. Malcolm Brenner, Department of Molecular and Human Genetics, Baylor College of Medicine, Houston, Texas. Clinical development of redirected T cells in solid tumours.
- Prof. Fred Fänderich, Klinik für angewandte Celltherapie, Universitetklinicum Schleswig-Holstein, Kiel. Joint protocol and GMP production of DC vaccines for treatment of brain tumours.
- Prof. Claudia Rossig, Universitetkinderklinik, Münster. Cellular based (T cells, NK cells and DC) therapy in children with neuroblastoma and Ewing sarcoma.
- Prof. Michael Nishimura, College of Medicine, Medical University of South Carolina. (Cancer Immunotherapy)
