= Cell sorting =

Process of separating populations of cells

Cell sorting is the process through which a particular cell type is separated from others contained in a sample on the basis of its physical or biological properties, such as size, morphological parameters, viability and both extracellular and intracellular protein expression. The homogeneous cell population obtained after sorting can be used for a variety of applications including research, diagnosis, and therapy.

== Methods ==
Methods of cell sorting fall into two major categories: fluorescence-activated cell sorting (FACS) and immunomagnetic cell sorting. Due to many years of refinement and increased demand for cell separation however, researchers are working to develop microfluidic sorting devices that have many benefits in comparison to the main types of fluorescence-activated cell sorting and immunomagnetic cell sorting methods.

=== Fluorescence-activated ===
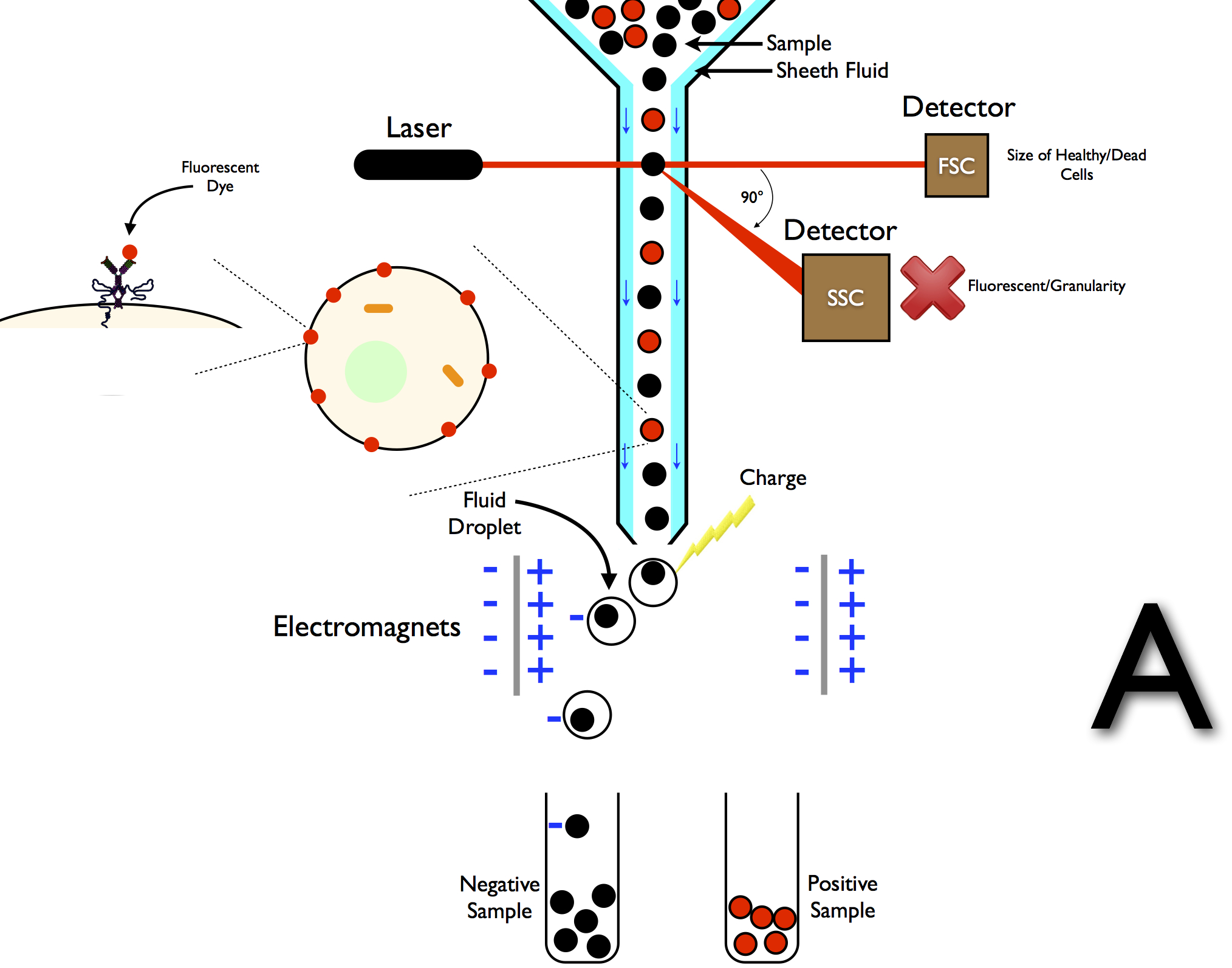
Diagram A: Fluorescence-assisted cell sorting for negative selection.

Fluorescence-Activated Cell Sorting is also known as flow cytometry cell sorting, or by the acronym FACS, which is a trademark of Becton Dickinson and Company. Fluorescence-activated cell sorting utilizes flow cytometry to separate cells based on morphological parameters and the expression of multiple extracellular and intracellular proteins. This method allows multiparameter cell sorting and involves encapsulating cells into small liquid droplets which are selectively given electric charges and sorted by an external electric field. Fluorescence-activated cell sorting has several systems that work together to achieve successful sorting of events of interest. These include fluidic, optical, and electrostatic systems. The fluidic system has to establish a precisely timed break-off from the liquid stream in small uniform droplets, so that droplets containing individual cells can then be deflected electrostatically Based on the invention of Richard Sweet, droplet formation of the liquid jet of a cell sorter is stabilized by vibrations of an ultrasonic transducer at the exit of the nozzle orifice. The disturbances grow exponentially and lead to breakup of the jet in droplets with precise timing. A cell of interest that should be sorted is measured at the sensing zone and moves down the stream to the breakoff point. During the separation of the droplet with the cell in it from the intact liquid jet, a voltage pulse is given to the liquid jet so that droplets containing the cells of interest can be deflected in an electric field between two deflection plates for sorting. The droplets are then caught by collection tubes or vessels placed below the deflection plates. Flow cytometry cell-sorting yields very high specificity according to one or several surface markers, but one limitation is constituted by the number of cells that can be processed during a work day. For this reason pre-enrichment of the population of interest by immunomagnetic cell sorting is often considered, especially when the target cells are comparatively rare and a large batch of cells must be processed. Moreover, flow cytometry cell-sorters are complex instruments that are generally used only by well-trained staff in flow cytometry facilities or well-equipped laboratories and, since they are normally large in size, it is not always possible to place them inside a biological safety cabinet. Therefore, it is not always possible to ensure sample sterility and, since the fluidic systems can be cleaned but are not single-use, there is the possibility of cross-contamination among samples. Another aspect to be considered is that droplet-generation inside the instrument could lead to aerosol formations that are hazardous to the operator when using infectious samples. These last considerations are of particular importance when cell sorting is used for clinical applications -- for example cell therapy -- and should be performed under Good Manufacturing Practice (GMP) conditions. Researchers can use a variety of fluorescent dyes to design multi-color panels to achieve successful, simultaneous sorting of multiple, precisely defined cell types. Diagram A shows fluorescence-activated cell sorting of negative cell selection (undesired group) and diagram B shows FACS of positive cell selection (desired group).

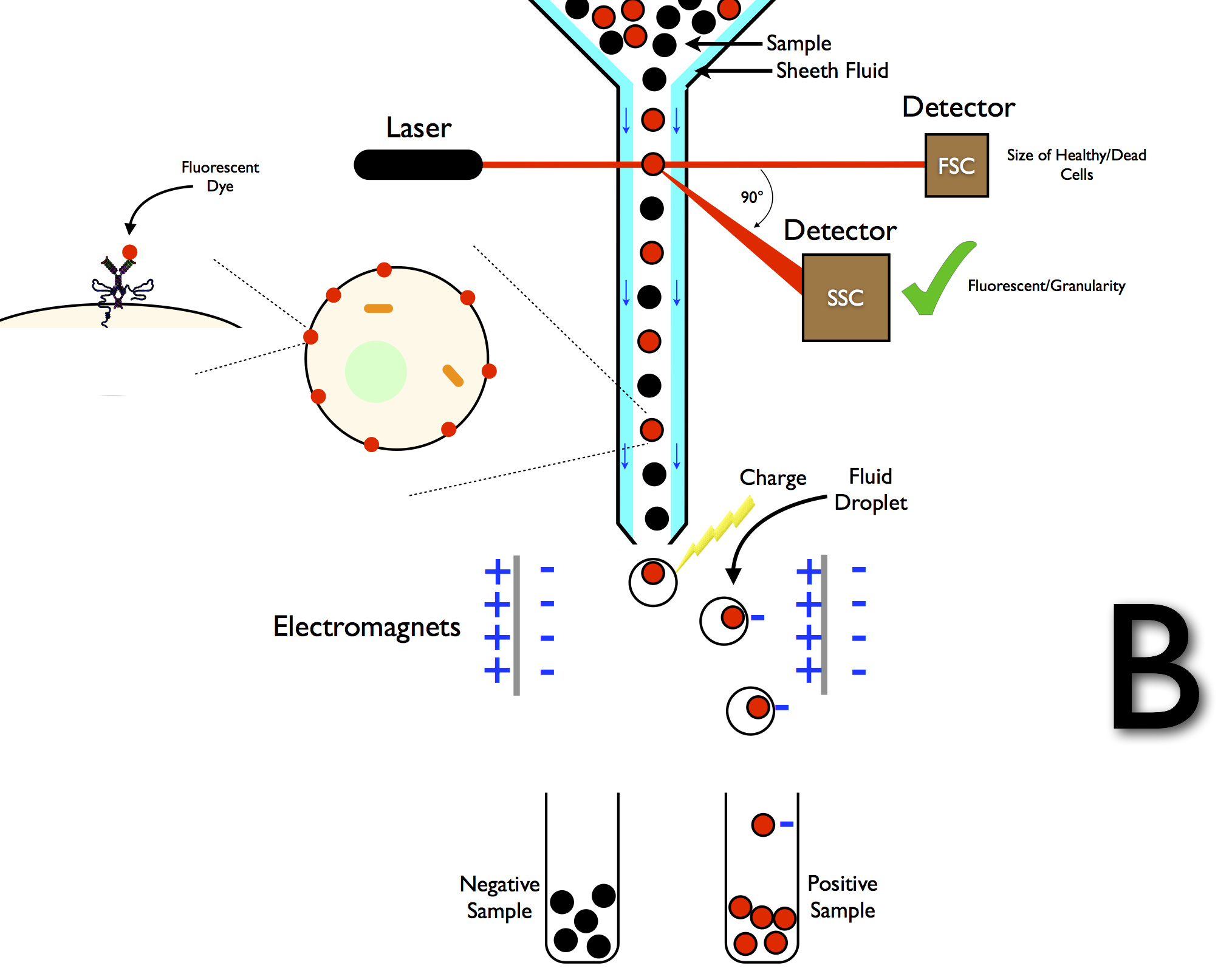
Diagram B: Fluorescence-assisted cell sorting for positive selection.

==== Fluorescent dyes in cell sorting ====
Fluorescent dyes can act very differently. Generally, a fluorescent dye will be excited by a light source (a laser) at a particular wavelength and emit light at a lower energy and longer wavelength. The most common dyes act by binding to antigens presented on cells. Common antigens targeted are clusters of differentiation (CDs). These are specific to a certain type of cell. If you can identify which CD is presented on your cells of interest, then you can stain your sample with a fluorescent dye specific to it, and use fluorescence-activated cell sorting to separate the population of interest. However, there are many other mechanisms by which fluorescent dyes can act.

Some dyes are able to diffuse across membranes. By taking advantage of this property of the dye, users can characterize intracellular activity as well as surface-expression of proteins. For example, in dead cells, propidium iodide (PI) can penetrate the nucleus where it binds to DNA. The fluorescent signal of PI can be used to quantify DNA content for cell cycle analysis or to identify dead cells in a sample.

Certain fluorescent dyes can be used to characterize kinetic intracellular activity rather than fixing cells in formaldehyde and losing viable cells. The table below outlines dyes that can be used to measure several parameters of cytotoxicity caused by oxidative stress.

Dye	Parameter	Mechanism of Action	Excitation/ Emission
DCFH-DA	Reactive Oxygen Species (ROS)	Deacetylated to 2'7' dichlorofluorescin which reacts with ROS under radical conditions to 2'7 dichlorofluorescein (DCF)	488 nm/525 nm
Rh123	Mitochondria Membrane Potential (MMP)	Sequestered by active mitochondria	488 nm/525 nm
Indo-1 AM	Calcium Levels	Emits at two different wavelengths depending on presence of calcium ions	350 nm/[400 nm/485 nm]
PI	Live/Dead	Permeates dead cells only and binds to DNA	488 nm/675 nm

This experimental setup is just one example of the capability of flow cytometry. In FACS systems, these characterized cells can then be sorted and purified for further experiments.

=== Immunomagnetic cell sorting ===
MACS

Immunomagnetic cell sorting is also known as immunomagnetic cell separation, immunomagnetic cell enrichment, or magnetic-activated cell sorting, and commonly known by the acronym MACS which is a trademark of Miltenyi GmbH. Immunomagnetic cell sorting is based on separation of beads passing a magnetic field. A variety of companies offer different solutions for enrichment or depletion of cell populations. Immunomagnetic cell sorting provides a method of enriching a heterogeneous mixture of cells based on cell-surface protein expression (antigens). This technology is based on the attachment of small, inert, supra-magnetic particles to mAbs specific for antigens on the target cell population. Cells labelled to these antibody-bead conjugates are then separated via a column containing a ferromagnetic matrix. By applying a magnetic field to the matrix, the beads stick to the matrix inside the column and the bead-carrying cells are held back from passing through. Unlabelled cells can pass through the matrix and are collected in the flow-through. To elute the trapped cells from the column, the magnetic field is simply removed. Immunomagnetic cell sorting therefore enables different strategies for positive enrichment or depletion of cells. Immunomagnetic beads are small and usually do not interfere with downstream assays, however for some applications it may be necessary to remove them. Using this separation method up-scaling the cell numbers does not significantly increase processing times, and the sterility of the sample is guaranteed if the cell sorting is performed inside a biosafety cabinet. On the other hand, this technique allows cells to separate based only on a single marker, and cannot discriminate between different levels of protein expression (quantitative analysis). Immunomagnetic cell sorting has shown to be beneficial when used with NPC (neural progenitor cell) cultures in particular, as it is easier to manage and causes minimal damage to live cells.

NPC cultures are especially difficult to work with because live brain cells are sensitive and tend to contaminate each other. In order to get clearer results, labs need cleaner materials, meaning more pure NPC lines. A study done in 2019 (with the funding support of New York Stem Cell Foundation and the Association for Frontotemporal Degeneration) found immunomagnetic cell sorting to be a cheap, simple way to yield such purity with minimal damage to the cell lines, therefore maintaining better quality cells, collecting more homogeneous NPCs, and increasing their chances of finding effective treatments for neurological disorders. They used both the immunomagnetic and fluorescence-activated methods to filter out CD271- (useful markers for mesenchymal stem cells) and CD133+ (markers for cancer stem cells) to compare viability of each method.

Immunomagnetic cell sorting has also been used in assistance with reproduction (artificial insemination) and retinal transplant treatment. In the case of assisting reproduction, apoptotic sperm cells (dead or damaged cells) are separated out so more non-apoptotic sperm (non-fragmented) cells can be collected and used to increase the subject's chances of fertility. This type of treatment has shown to be more effective when done repeatedly, increasing the amount of non-apoptotic cells present during insemination.

A 2018 study done in France (with the support of multiple individuals and agencies including: the Institut de la Vision in Paris and the Retina France Association) used rats and the immunomagnetic cell-sorting method to show that photoreceptors (cells in the retina which respond to light) may be transplanted to cure blindness. In this process, the microbeads were attached to the CD73 enzyme to assist in the separation of PRs (photoreceptors) from retinal organoids. When a CD73+ antigen expressed itself with RCVRN+ cells (calcium-binding proteins in the eye), it showed researchers that this combination of CD73+ and RCVRN+ could be used with post-mitotic PR precursors for repair. Although the study could not verify success in humans, they have the foundation for further research based on the success of pairing non-damaged photoreceptors with a CD73 antigen and the transplantation in rats. This success in cell separation and pairing through transplantation shows promise for a potential cure for retinal diseases including total blindness. So far, only partial vision repair has been reported.

=== Microfluidic devices ===
Due to various limitations of fluorescence-activated and immunomagnetic cell sorting devices, a wide range of microfluidic cell-sorting devices have emerged. A few of these are now commercially available or in commercial development. Research into microfluidic cell-sorter designs often employ soft lithography techniques utilizing materials such as polydimethylsiloxane (PDMS).

A key benefit of microfluidic sorters is the potential to perform fluorescence-activated cell sorting in a closed single-use sterile cartridge. Such a closed cartridge would prevent the exposure of an operator to biohazards through the droplets that are emitted by FACS systems. Other benefits include reduced impact on cell viability due to reduced hydrodynamic stress on the cells. Some published devices show the potential for multi-way sorting, decreased cost of a cartridge due to low-cost manufacturing methods, lower power consumption, and smaller-sized footprints, with some devices being the size of a credit card. Some have achieved high-purity outputs and rates of up to around 50,000 cells/s.

Microfluidic cell-sorters can be divided into two categories: active and passive. Active devices deflect individual cells by the cytometric measurements of the cells, made in real time. Passive devices exploit physical differences between cells in how they interact with the fluid flow or surfaces.

==== Active ====
Active microfluidic cell-sorters involve the deflection of individual cells following their measurement using cytometric methods, including fluorescent labelling, light-scatter and image analysis. Individual cells are deflected by either a force directly on the cell or a force on the fluid surrounding the cells, so that they flow into separate output vessels.

Methods of cell deflection employ several kinds of macroscopic, optical or MEMS (micro-electro-mechanical systems) actuators to deflect a particle or liquid volume within a microchannel. Notable recent examples are based on surface acoustic wave actuators, macroscopic actuators (such as piezoelectric actuators) coupled to microchannels, dielectrophoresis of droplets, thermal vapor bubble actuators, transient micro-vortices generated by thermal vapour bubble actuators, optical manipulation, and micro-mechanical valves. The fastest of these have demonstrated sort rates in excess of 1000/s and potential maximum throughput rates in some cases approaching those of FACS. Active microfluidic cell sorting requires similar cytometry instrumentation as fluorescence-activated cell sorting described above.

Active microfluidic cell-sorters have the potential of throughput scaling by parallelisation on chip. The fastest published active microfluidic sorting device has demonstrated a 160,000/s throughput

==== Passive ====
Passive cell sorting uses the behavior of the fluid within the microchannels to alter and separate cells based on size and morphology. The fluid in a colloidal solution is subject to a velocity profile due to the interactions of the fluid with the walls of the channel; the cells in the solution are subject to various drag and inertial forces that are dependent on the size of the cell and balance accordingly at different locations along the velocity profile. In curved microfluidic channels, vortices are formed due to the Dean force which locate different sized particles in different cross sectional locations due to the Reynolds number and curve radius of curvature.

For example, in a straight channel, larger cells in colloidal solution are found closer to the center of the microchannel than smaller cells due to the larger drag forces from the wall that pushes the cell away from the wall and the shear gradient force from the velocity profile that balances this wall drag force to set the cell into equilibrium.

=== Other antibody-based methods of cell separation ===
Several methods of cell separation and enrichment using antibodies were employed before fluorescence-based and immunomagnetic cell sorting gained popularity. These included antibody- and complement-mediated cell separation, polystyrene immunoaffinity devices, and the CellPro CEPRATE® SC System which employed immobilised antibodies in a porous column. The latter was the first FDA-approved medical device for the separation of hematopoietic stem cells.

A newer cell separation technique employing antibodies is buoyancy-activated cell sorting (BACS) is a separation technique in which microbubbles bind to cells through antibodies binding to the surface of cells. The targeted cells are then removed from a biological sample through flotation.

== Single-cell sorting ==
Single-cell sorting provides a method for sorting a heterogeneous mixture of cells based on intracellular and extracellular properties. Single-cell methods enable understanding of cellular properties that may be obscured or non-evident. There are several methods for sorting single cells:

The microraft array provides a rapid, cost-effective method for isolating cells, analyzing cells over time, and generating clonal populations with the ability to monitor all intra- and extracellular properties. This system is suitable for both adherent and non-adherent cell types.

A single-cell method to observe the response to an external stimulus (in this case, cellular response to a ligand) was studied using a microfluidic device with micro-channel valves to trap a single cell in a chamber. A 23-valve system was used for actuation, and fluorescent dye was used in stimulus-response imaging.

Single-cell clustering methods are a series of statistical methods designed by data scientists based on intracellular properties. The process includes Single Cell RNA-Seq data gathering; data preprocessing for clustering; clustering; and evaluations of clustering. Scientists apply machine-learning methods (mainly clustering analysis) on the single-cell RNA-Seq data to divide the cells into different categories. All the methods are modified to resolve the problems in RNA-Seq data such as dropout of low-expression genes and ambiguous cell markers in the presence of technical biases. State-of-the-art methods include SC3., CIDR., Seurat and for more detailed information, please refer to the Wiki page: Single Cell RNA-Seq Clustering.
