= Immunostaining =

Biochemical technique

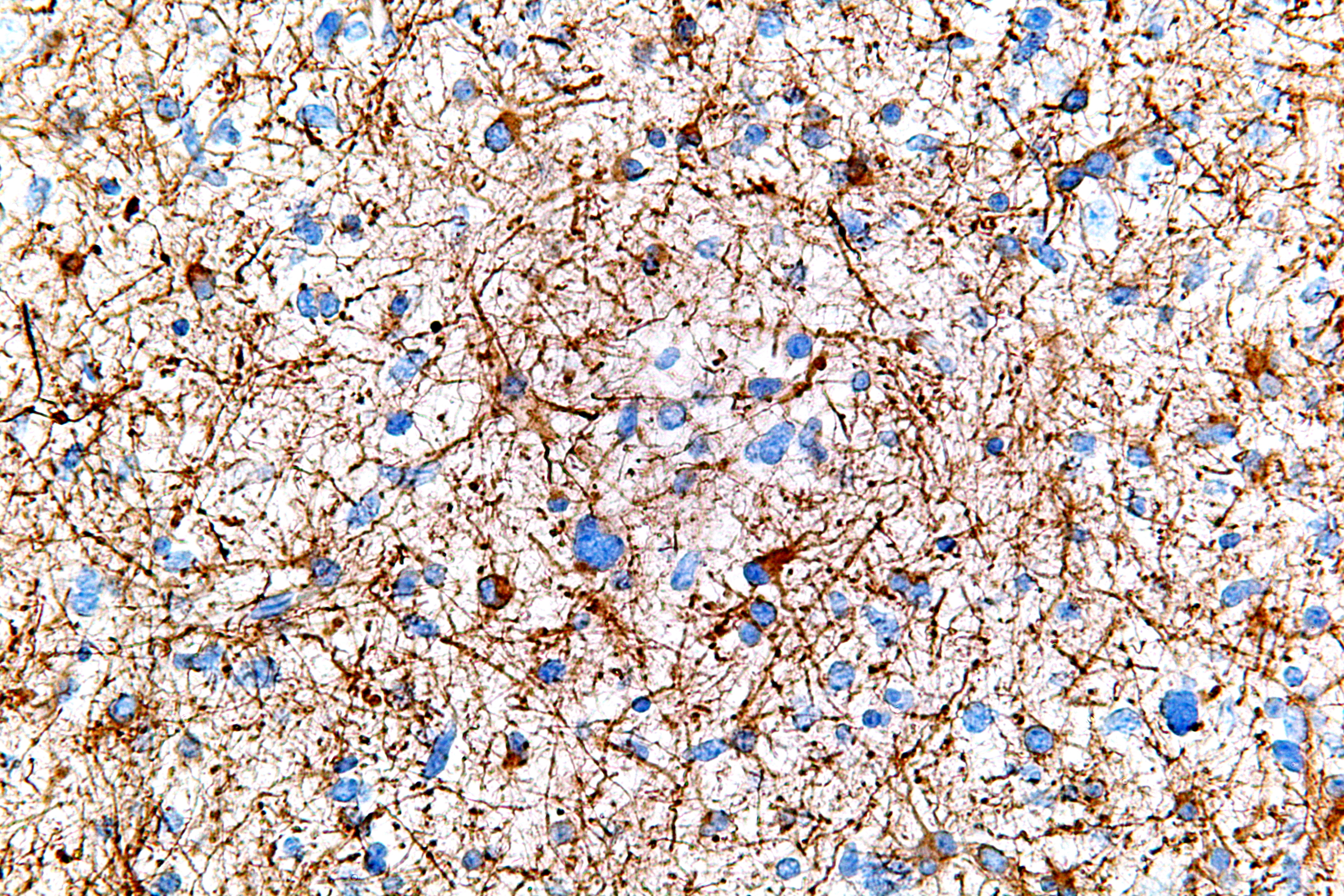
Micrograph of a GFAP immunostained section of a brain tumour

In biochemistry, immunostaining is any use of an antibody-based method to detect a specific protein in a sample. The term "immunostaining" was originally used to refer to the immunohistochemical staining of tissue sections, as first described by Albert Coons in 1941. However, immunostaining now encompasses a broad range of techniques used in histology, cell biology, and molecular biology that use antibody-based staining methods.

== Techniques ==
=== Immunohistochemistry ===
Immunohistochemistry or IHC staining of tissue sections (or immunocytochemistry, which is the staining of cells), is perhaps the most commonly applied immunostaining technique. While the first cases of IHC staining used fluorescent dyes (see immunofluorescence), other non-fluorescent methods using enzymes such as peroxidase (see immunoperoxidase staining) and alkaline phosphatase are now used. These enzymes are capable of catalysing reactions that give a coloured product that is easily detectable by light microscopy. Alternatively, radioactive elements can be used as labels, and the immunoreaction can be visualized by autoradiography.

Tissue preparation or fixation is essential for the preservation of cell morphology and tissue architecture. Inappropriate or prolonged fixation may significantly diminish the antibody binding capability. Many antigens can be successfully demonstrated in formalin-fixed paraffin-embedded tissue sections. However, some antigens will not survive even moderate amounts of aldehyde fixation. Under these conditions, tissues should be rapidly fresh frozen in liquid nitrogen and cut with a cryostat. The disadvantages of frozen sections include poor morphology, poor resolution at higher magnifications, difficulty in cutting over paraffin sections, and the need for frozen storage. Alternatively, vibratome sections do not require the tissue to be processed through organic solvents or high heat, which can destroy the antigenicity, or disrupted by freeze thawing. The disadvantage of vibratome sections is that the sectioning process is slow and difficult with soft and poorly fixed tissues, and that chatter marks or vibratome lines are often apparent in the sections.

The detection of many antigens can be dramatically improved by antigen retrieval methods that act by breaking some of the protein cross-links formed by fixation to uncover hidden antigenic sites. This can be accomplished by heating for varying lengths of times (heat induced epitope retrieval or HIER) or using enzyme digestion (proteolytic induced epitope retrieval or PIER).

One of the main difficulties with IHC staining is overcoming specific or non-specific background. Optimisation of fixation methods and times, pre-treatment with blocking agents, incubating antibodies with high salt, and optimising post-antibody wash buffers and wash times are all important for obtaining high quality immunostaining. In addition, the presence of both positive and negative controls for staining are essential for determining specificity.

=== Flow cytometry ===
A flow cytometer can be used for the direct analysis of cells expressing one or more specific proteins. Cells are immunostained in solution using methods similar to those used for immunofluorescence, and then analysed by flow cytometry.

Flow cytometry has several advantages over IHC including: the ability to define distinct cell populations by their size and granularity; the capacity to gate out dead cells; improved sensitivity; and multi-colour analysis to measure several antigens simultaneously. However, flow cytometry can be less effective at detecting extremely rare cell populations, and there is a loss of architectural relationships in the absence of a tissue section. Flow cytometry also has a high capital cost associated with the purchase of a flow cytometer.

=== Western blotting ===
Western blotting allows the detection of specific proteins from extracts made from cells or tissues, before or after any purification steps. Proteins are generally separated by size using gel electrophoresis before being transferred to a synthetic membrane via dry, semi-dry, or wet blotting methods. The membrane can then be probed using antibodies using methods similar to immunohistochemistry, but without a need for fixation. Detection is typically performed using peroxidase linked antibodies to catalyse a chemiluminescent reaction.

Western blotting is a routine molecular biology method that can be used to semi-quantitatively compare protein levels between extracts. The size separation prior to blotting allows the protein molecular weight to be gauged as compared with known molecular weight markers.

=== Enzyme-linked immunosorbent assay ===
The enzyme-linked immunosorbent assay or ELISA is a diagnostic method for quantitatively or semi-quantitatively determining protein concentrations from blood plasma, serum or cell/tissue extracts in a multi-well plate format (usually 96-wells per plate). Broadly, proteins in solution are absorbed to ELISA plates. Antibodies specific for the protein of interest are used to probe the plate. Background is minimised by optimising blocking and washing methods (as for IHC), and specificity is ensured via the presence of positive and negative controls. Detection methods are usually colorimetric or chemiluminescence based.

=== Immuno-electron microscopy ===
Electron microscopy or EM can be used to study the detailed microarchitecture of tissues or cells. Immuno-EM allows the detection of specific proteins in ultrathin tissue sections. Antibodies labelled with heavy metal particles (e.g. gold) can be directly visualised using transmission electron microscopy. While powerful in detecting the sub-cellular localisation of a protein, immuno-EM can be technically challenging, expensive, and require rigorous optimisation of tissue fixation and processing methods. Protein biotinylation in vivo was proposed to alleviate the problems caused by frequent incompatibility of antibody staining with fixation protocols that better preserve cell morphology.

== Methodological overview ==
In immunostaining methods, an antibody is used to detect a specific protein epitope. These antibodies can be monoclonal or polyclonal. Detection of this first or primary antibody can be accomplished in multiple ways.

- The primary antibody can be directly labeled using an enzyme or fluorophore.
- The primary antibody can be labeled using a small molecule which interacts with a high affinity binding partner that can be linked to an enzyme or fluorophore. The biotin-streptavidin is one commonly used high affinity interaction.
- The primary antibody can be probed for using a broader species-specific secondary antibody that is labeled using an enzyme, or fluorophore.
- In the case of electron microscopy, antibodies are linked to a heavy metal particle (typically gold nanoparticles in the range 5–15 nm diameter).

As previously described, enzymes such as horseradish peroxidase or alkaline phosphatase are commonly used to catalyse reactions that give a coloured or chemiluminescent product. Fluorescent molecules can be visualised using fluorescence microscopy or confocal microscopy.

== Applications ==
The applications of immunostaining are numerous, but are most typically used in clinical diagnostics and laboratory research.

Clinically, IHC is used in histopathology for the diagnosis of specific types of cancers based on molecular markers.

In laboratory science, immunostaining can be used for a variety of applications based on investigating the presence or absence of a protein, its tissue distribution, its sub-cellular localisation, and of changes in protein expression or degradation.

== See also ==
- Cutaneous conditions with immunofluorescence findings
- Immunostaining protocol
- List of histologic stains that aid in diagnosis of cutaneous conditions
