= Molecular Neurobiology (journal) =

- Discipline: Molecular neuroscience
- Language: English
- Edited by: Benedict C. Albensi, PhD, BCMAS, CRQM

Publication details
- History: 1987-present
- Publisher: Springer Science+Business Media
- Frequency: Bimonthly
- Impact factor: 5.590 (2020)

Standard abbreviations
- ISO 4: Mol. Neurobiol.

Indexing
- CODEN: MONBEW
- ISSN: 0893-7648 (print); 1559-1182 (web)
- LCCN: 87659194
- OCLC no.: 15640289

Links
- Journal homepage; Online archive

Molecular Neurobiology is a bimonthly peer-reviewed scientific journal covering all aspects of molecular neuroscience. It was established in 1987 and is published by Springer Science+Business Media. The editor-in-chief is Benedict C. Albensi (Nova Southeastern University). Dr. Albensi is an American-born (greater New York area) full professor and chair of the department of pharmaceutical sciences and highly accomplished in neuroscience research and academic administration.

== Abstracting and indexing ==
The journal is abstracted and indexed in:

- Academic OneFile
- AGRICOLA
- Aquatic Sciences and Fisheries Abstracts
- Biological Abstracts
- BIOSIS Previews
- Chemical Abstracts Service
- EMBASE
- MEDLINE/PubMed
- PsycINFO
- Science Citation Index
- Scopus

According to the Journal Citation Reports, the journal has a 2020 impact factor of 5.590.
