= Microraft =

A Microraft (Isoraft) is an arrays of microwells for cell sorting, isolating cells, analyzing cells over time, and generating clonal populations. This platform provides biomedical scientists with access to diverse cell culture surfaces with integrated, easy-to-use cell separating capabilities at low cost.

== Platform ==
The microrafts have bases composed of detachable concave elements fabricated by a dip-coating process using a polydimethylsiloxane mold as the template and the array substrate. This manufacturing approach allows the microrafts to possess low autofluorescence and can therefore be utilized for fluorescence-based identification of cells. Cells plated on the microarray settle and attach at the center of the wells due to the microrafts’ concavity. Individual microrafts are dislodged using a needle inserted through the compliant polymer substrate. The hard polymer material of the microrafts protect the cells from damage by the needle. Cell analysis and isolation can be carried out using a standard inverted microscope. Released cells/microrafts can be collected, cultured and clonally expanded.

== Utility ==
Using this system, extremely high single-cell cloning rates of greater than 95% have been achieved.

This system is ideal for both adherent and non-adherent cell types.
