= Dynabeads =

Dynabeads are superparamagnetic spherical polymer particles with a uniform size and a consistent, defined surface for the adsorption or coupling of various bioreactive molecules or cells.

== Development and description ==
Dynabeads were developed after John Ugelstad managed to create uniform polystyrene spherical beads (defined as microbeads) of exactly the same size, at the University of Trondheim, Norway in 1976, something otherwise only achieved by NASA in the weightless conditions of SkyLab. Dynabeads are typically 1 to 5 micrometers in diameter. This is in contrast to Magnetic-activated cell sorting beads, which are approximately 50 nm.

The technology behind the beads, called Dynabeads, was licensed to Dynal in 1980.

Following a series of mergers and acquisitions, Dynal and Dynabeads are currently owned and produced by Invitrogen, part of Thermo Fisher Scientific.

== Applications ==
This discovery of Dynabeads revolutionised the liquid-phase kinetic separation of many biological materials. Since being licensed to Dynal in 1980, this magnetic separation technology has been since used for the isolation and manipulation of biological material, including cells, nucleic acids, proteins and pathogenic microorganisms. The uniformity in size, shape, and surface area allow for reproducibility and help to minimize chemical agglutination.

Dynabeads are frequently used for cell isolation. Cell-types often of interest to purify may be specific leukocytes, such as CD4+ T cells, stem cells, or circulating tumor cells (CTCs). Dynabeads may be covalently linked to an antibody that recognizes a specific protein on the surface of the target cell-type. Alternatively, Dynabeads may attach to the cell indirectly, either via streptavidin on the Dynabead linking to a biotinylated primary antibody, or a secondary antibody on the Dynabead linking to the primary antibody. Streptavidin linkage to the primary antibody allows Dynabeads to capture cells with lower expression of the surface protein.

== See also ==
- Plastic magnet
- Flow cytometry
- Magnetic-activated cell sorting
