= Ugelstad Laboratory =

Norwegian research institute

Coordinates: 63.4160°N 10.4054°E

The Ugelstad Laboratory was founded at the Norwegian University of Science and Technology (NTNU), Trondheim, Norway, in January 2002 to commemorate the late Professor John Ugelstad.

The laboratory specialises in surfactant chemistry and its technical applications, emulsions and emulsion technology, preparation of polymers and polymer particles - such as the monosized microbeads - and their technical applications, plasma chemical modification of surfaces and silica-based chemistry.

Applications include microfluidics, crude oil production and processing, produced water treatment, wastewater treatment, wood pulp and paper, biomedicine, catalysis and material science.

The main purpose is to raise the national level of colloidal science.

Ugelstad Laboratory Days are organized every second year to communicate the ongoing research activity with the academic community invited. The last Ugelstad Laboratory day was held on the 27th of May, 2025. Lab members and industry collaborators gave presentations.
