= Miltenyi Biotec =

Global biotechnology company

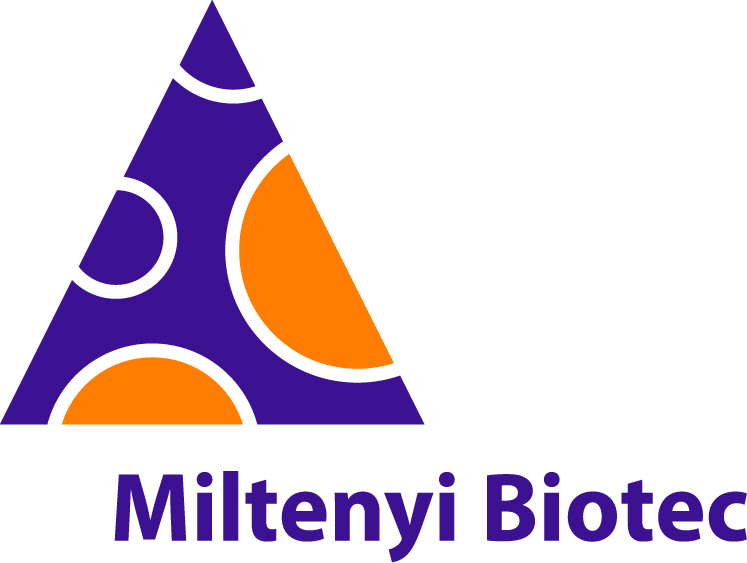
- Company type: Private
- Industry: Biotechnology
- Founded: 1989; 37 years ago
- Founder: Stefan Miltenyi
- Headquarters: Bergisch Gladbach, North Rhine-Westphalia, Germany
- Key people: Stefan Miltenyi, Founder & President Dr. Boris Stoffel, Norbert Hentschel, Dr. Jürgen Schmitz, Dr. Antoon Overstijns
- Products: MACS Sample Preparation gentleMACS Dissociators; MACS Cell Separation autoMACS Pro Separator; MACS Flow Cytometry; MACSQuant Analyzers; MACS Antibodies; MACSmolecular; CliniMACS System; MACS Cell Culture; MACS Media; MACS Cytokines; TheraSorb Viscover Imaging Agents
- Number of employees: ~5,500
- Website: www.miltenyibiotec.com

Miltenyi Biotec is a global biotechnology company headquartered near Cologne in Bergisch Gladbach, Germany. The company is a provider of products and services for scientists, clinical researchers, and physicians to use in their basic research, translational research, and clinical applications. These services include techniques of sample preparation, cell separation, cell sorting, flow cytometry, spatial biology, cell culture, molecular analysis, clinical applications and small animal imaging. According to Miltenyi Biotec own internal sources, the company states that it has over 3,000 employees in 28 countries and produces more than 17,000 products although this has not been independently verified.

== Products ==
Miltenyi Biotec states that their products have been cited in publications and used in clinical treatments although details on figures has not been independently verified. However, publications that have cited Miltenyi Biotec products can be accessed through CiteAb, an antibody search engine which lists 4591 Miltenyi Biotec products.

Miltenyi Biotec instruments, reagents and services are intended support basic research, clinical research, and the translation of basic research findings into clinical applications that aims to treat severe diseases. Services offered by Miltenyi Biotec include gene expression analysis and contract production of biologicals according to GMP guidelines.

Miltenyi Biotec technologies are used in applications concerned with accessing, analyzing, and utilizing primary and primary-derived cells – across basic research, translational research, and clinical applications. Examples of these applications include sample preparation, cell separation, cell sorting, flow cytometry, molecular applications, cell culture up to GMP grade, preclinical imaging, clinical-grade cell preservation, and clinical-scale cell processing. The company’s reagents and devices are used primarily in the research areas of immunology, stem cell biology, neuroscience and cancer.

=== Sample Preparation ===
Miltenyi Biotec offers instruments, tools and reagents to facilitate sample preparation.

== Application areas ==
Miltenyi Biotec products are used commonly in the application areas of immunology, stem cell biology, neuroscience and cancer. Their products are used from basic research to clinical applications and are designed to support the successful translation of findings into practical applications that enhance human health and well being. Enabling translational research is a major mission of the company, as is advancing cellular therapy. The company’s products aim to support the development of cellular therapies and make cellular therapy a more viable reality for more patients.

== History ==
- 1989 – Stefan Miltenyi invents magnetic-activated cell separation
- 1990 – Miltenyi Biotec patents MACS Technology
- 1992 – Miltenyi Biotec opens its U.S. subsidiary
- 1995 – Miltenyi Biotec opens its UK subsidiary
- 1998 – Miltenyi Biotec opens its France, Italy and Spain subsidiaries
- 2001 – Miltenyi Biotec opens its China location
- 2002 – Miltenyi Biotec acquires the plasma absorber technology developed by PlasmaSelect AG and markets the products under the trademark TheraSorb
- 2002 – Miltenyi Biotec opens its Australia subsidiary
- 2003 – Miltenyi Biotec opens its GMP facility in Teterow, Germany
- 2003 – Miltenyi Biotec opens its Japan and Singapore subsidiaries
- 2003 – Miltenyi Biotec acquires Memorec Biotec GmbH
- 2004 – Miltenyi Biotec opens its Benelux subsidiary in the Netherlands
- 2008 – Miltenyi Biotec acquires Medic Tools AG
- 2008 – Miltenyi Biotec launches its autoMACS Pro Separator cell separation instrument
- 2008 – Miltenyi Biotec launches its MACSQuant Analyzer flow cytometry instrument
- 2011 – Miltenyi Biotec acquires Coley Pharmaceutical Group
- 2011 – Miltenyi Biotec partners with TeutoCell to develop novel cell culture techniques
- 2012 – Miltenyi Biotec opens its Nordic subsidiary in Sweden
- 2012 – Miltenyi Biotec opens its Korea subsidiary in Seoul, South Korea
- 2013 – Miltenyi Biotec acquires Owl biomedical, adding to their portfolio new microchip-based cell sorting technology
- 2014 – Miltenyi Biotec receives FDA approval for CliniMACS® CD34 Reagent System for prevention of graft-versus-host disease in the treatment of acute myeloid leukemia
- 2014 – Miltenyi Biotec acquires gene therapy assets from Lentigen Corporation
- 2017 – Acquisition of imaging specialist Sensovation AG
- 2018 – Acquisition of microscopy specialist LaVision BioTec

== Structure ==
Miltenyi Biotec is a limited liability company (referred to as GmbH in Germany). The officers of the company are Stefan Miltenyi (Founder and President), Dr. Boris Stoffel, Norbert Hentschel, Dr. Juergen Schmitz, Dr. Antoon Overstijns. Headquartered in Bergisch Gladbach with a GMP facility in Teterow, Germany, Miltenyi Biotec also has locations in the United States (two GMP facilities), Great Britain, France, Belgium, Italy, Spain, China, Australia, Japan, The Netherlands, Singapore and Sweden.

The company has more than 3,500 employees worldwide (approx. 800 in the United States).

The North American Divisions are supported by Miltenyi Biotec North America, which provides all central services to the North American Divisions.
