= Magnetic-activated cell sorting =

Magnetic-activated cell sorting (MACS) is a method for separation of various cell populations depending on their surface antigens (CD molecules) invented by Miltenyi Biotec. The name MACS is a registered trademark of the company.

The method was developed with Miltenyi Biotec's MACS system, which uses superparamagnetic nanoparticles and columns. The superparamagnetic nanoparticles are of the order of 100 nm. They are used to tag the targeted cells in order to capture them inside the column. The column is placed between permanent magnets so that when the magnetic particle–cell complex passes through it, the tagged cells can be captured. The column consists of steel wool, which increases the magnetic field gradient to maximize separation efficiency when the column is placed between the permanent magnets.

Magnetic-activated cell sorting is a commonly used method in areas like immunology, cancer research, neuroscience, and stem cell research. Miltenyi sells microbeads which are magnetic nanoparticles conjugated to antibodies which can be used to target specific cells.

In the assisted reproductive technology (ART) field, the apoptotic spermatozoa (those who are programmed to die) are bound in annexin V (a membrane apoptotic marker) by specific monoclonal antibodies which are conjugated to a magnetic microsphere. Using a MACS column, it is possible to separate the healthy spermatozoa from the apoptotic ones.

== Procedure ==
The MACS method allows cells to be separated by using magnetic nanoparticles coated with antibodies against a particular surface antigen. This causes the cells expressing this antigen to attach to the magnetic nanoparticles. After incubating the beads and cells, the solution is transferred to a column in a strong magnetic field. In this step, the cells attached to the nanoparticles (expressing the antigen) stay on the column, while other cells (not expressing the antigen) flow through. With this method, the cells can be separated positively or negatively with respect to the particular antigen(s).

=== Positive and negative selection ===
With positive selection, the cells expressing the antigen(s) of interest, which attached to the magnetic column, are washed out to a separate vessel, after removing the column from the magnetic field. This method is useful for isolation of a particular cell type, for instance CD4 lymphocytes.

Moreover, it enables early detection of sperm which initiate apoptosis, although they may show an adequate appearance and motility. A magnetic-labelled receptor that binds to annexin is added to sperm. Inside normal cells, phosphatidylserine molecules are located within the cell membrane towards the cytoplasm. Nevertheless, in those cells that initiate the apoptotic process phosphatidylserine instead faces the cell membrane outer side, binding to the annexin conjugate. Therefore, normal spermatozoa will pass through the column without binding to the labelled receptor. On the other hand, proapoptotic sperm will remain trapped, which turns out as a sperm selection process thanks to the magnetic-labeled antibody. Finally, this technique has shown its efficacy, even though it remains limited.

With negative selection, the antibody used is against surface antigen(s) which are known to be present on cells that are not of interest. After administration of the cells/magnetic nanoparticles solution onto the column the cells expressing these antigens bind to the column and the fraction that goes through is collected, as it contains almost no cells with these undesired antigens.

== Modifications ==
Magnetic nanoparticles conjugated to an antibody against an antigen of interest are not always available, but there is a way to circumvent it. Since fluorophore-conjugated antibodies are much more prevalent, it is possible to use magnetic nanoparticles coated with anti-fluorochrome antibodies. They are incubated with the fluorescent-labelled antibodies against the antigen of interest and may thus serve for cell separation with respect to the antigen.

== See also ==
- Dynabeads
- Flow cytometry
