= John Ugelstad =

Norwegian chemical engineer and inventor

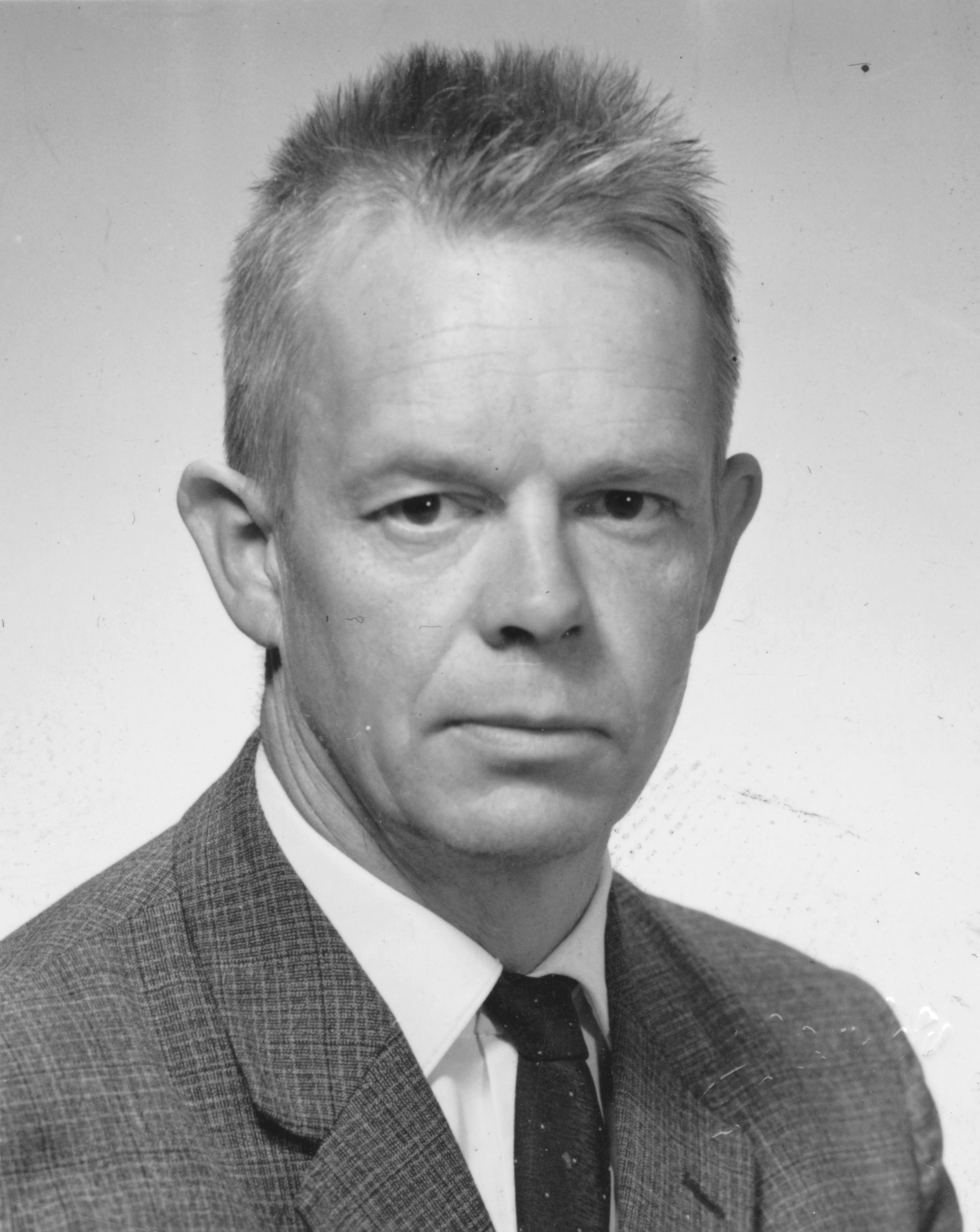
- Born: 31 March 1921; Trondheim
- Died: 3 April 1997 (aged 76)
- Education: chemical engineering
- Alma mater: Norwegian Institute of Technology (NTH)
- Known for: discovering a process to manufacture microbeads and dynabeads
- Spouse: Viola Kristine Rigstad
- Scientific career
- Fields: polymer chemistry

John Ugelstad (31 March 1921 – 3 April 1997) was a Norwegian chemical engineer and inventor, known for discovering a process to manufacture monodisperse micropellets or microbeads and dynabeads. He was a professor at the Norwegian Institute of Technology and consultant for DuPont.

== Early life and education ==
Ugelstad was born in Trondheim to Karen Stene (1898-1993) and Petter Endresen Ugelstad (1893-1975), a factory owner. He grew up and attended school in Trondheim. After graduating in 1941 he began to study chemistry at Norwegian Institute of Technology (NTH); the German occupation of Trondheim during World War II delayed his studies and he passed the engineering exam in 1948.

== Career ==
After a few years in business, he worked a few years at Philips Group's research department in Eindhoven in the Netherlands and obtained a PhD at the University of Leiden in 1955. He was employed by SINTEF and since 1957 by the Institute of Industrial Chemistry at NTH. During a sabbatical in Norwegian's research department from 1964 to 1965, he was the brains behind a new and epochal theory of emulsion polymerization which replaced the former and well-established theories and was dominated the field. This work was in practice as important as the monodisperse spheres.

In 1966 he became a professor at NTH where he stayed until 1991. Besides teaching and research, he took on a number of assignments for industry, including being the main consultant in theoretical polymer chemistry for DuPont. Ugelstad was already an internationally known researcher for his work in polymer chemistry when he first heard about the problem of preparing monodisperse spheres at a conference in the United States. Back in Trondheim he began to romp with the problem and thought it should be possible to make the particles in a regular laboratory. He said that he always thought best at night and one late hour in 1977 an idea occurred to him. When he realized how easy it was to manufacture the tiny particles (15 million of them weigh a milligram, and the spheres are similar almost to microglobules in milk), he thought others would also discover the method. Therefore, he patented it. The patent application concerned a method for producing polymer particles in a two-stage treatment dissolved in water, where they can absorb more than 1,000 times their own volume of water-soluble organisms.

Relatively shortly after his breakthrough Ugelstad gave a lecture in the United States. After the lecture some scientists asked if it was possible to magnetize the spheres, so they could be used to separate cells. The inquiry sparked new nights with research problems in John Ugelstad bedrooms and resulted in the development of magnetic monodisperse particles at SINTEF. The solution was designated as ingenious in its simplicity. Basically he made particles paramagnetic, i.e. they are only magnetic in a magnetic field. When this field is removed, the particles are non-magnetic.

Kjell Nustad and Gunnar Kvalheim, specialist physicians at the Norwegian Radium Hospital in Oslo were central to the developing the particles for medical use. In 1983, the microspheress were used to treat bone marrow cancer. The method, briefly, is to remove some of the bone marrow on strong cancer patients, adding the magnetic beads, removing cancer cells in vitro and re-infusing the treated bone marrow to the patient.

== Achievement ==
Ugelstad's scientific efforts between 1972 and 1982 made him famous in scientific circles worldwide. Ugelstad approached 60 years and had worked at the Norwegian Institute of Technology (NTH) in Trondheim for 20 years when he in 1976 succeeded to produce monodisperse spheres, i.e. microscopically identical particles. The method is one of the most important in biochemical analysis in the second half of the 1900s. US researchers had attempted to produce monodisperse spheres for years, but had given up making them on Earth. They believed, long after Ugelstad had found the method to produce them in a laboratory, that it was only possible to produce such particles in weightless conditions in space. The monodisperse particles made it possible to conduct analyzes in a fraction of the time previously and produce a biological material. The beads were absolutely indispensable in various forms of cancer treatment and important in dealing with AIDS, bacteriology and DNA technology. The medical use of bullets was the main result of the discovery.

== Honors ==
Ugelstad was a member of the Norwegian Academy of Science and Letters, the Royal Norwegian Society of Sciences and Letters and an honorary member of the Norwegian Academy of Technological Sciences. He received numerous awards, including DKNVS 'Gunnerus Medal and Norwegian Technological Research Council Award (both 1986). Ugelstad was decorated Commander of the Order of St. Olav in 1990. in 2002, the Ugelstad Laboratory in Trondheim was named after him.

== Personal life ==
Ugelstad married artist Viola Kristine Rigstad (7 May 1922 - 27 Jan 2017) on 25 January 1948, who was the daughter of Karl Rigstad, a miner, (1896-1973) and Hanna Kristine Villiksdatter Sommervold (1896-1969).

Ugelstad said about his own work: "My work has been like an obsession. I am a slave of my work, but love slavery. A researcher's life consists of disappointments and joys. Sometimes it seems all hope out there, other times solutions come as gifts from heaven. When you feel gratitude, as a select. Research is a fascinating business with incredible opportunities for travel and discovery in an unexplored world."

== See also ==
- Plastic particle water pollution
