= Primary and secondary antibodies =

Primary and secondary antibodies are two groups of antibodies that are classified based on whether they bind to antigens or proteins directly or target another (primary) antibody that, in turn, is bound to an antigen or protein.

== Primary ==
A primary antibody can be very useful for the detection of biomarkers for diseases such as cancer, diabetes, Parkinson’s and Alzheimer’s disease and they are used for the study of absorption, distribution, metabolism, and excretion (ADME) and multi-drug resistance (MDR) of therapeutic agents.

The primary antibody binds to an antigen (in red). A labeled secondary antibody (in green), then binds to the primary antibody. The label is then used to indirectly detect the antigen.

== Secondary ==
Secondary antibodies provide signal detection and amplification along with extending the utility of an antibody through conjugation to proteins. Secondary antibodies are especially efficient in immunolabeling. Secondary antibodies bind to primary antibodies, which are directly bound to the target antigen(s). In immunolabeling, the primary antibody's Fab domain binds to an antigen and exposes its Fc domain to secondary antibody. Then, the secondary antibody's Fab domain binds to the primary antibody's Fc domain. Since the Fc domain is constant within the same animal class, only one type of secondary antibody is required to bind to many types of primary antibodies. This reduces the cost by labeling only one type of secondary antibody, rather than labeling various types of primary antibodies. Secondary antibodies help increase sensitivity and signal amplification due to multiple secondary antibodies binding to a primary antibody.

Whole Immunoglobulin molecule secondary antibodies are the most commonly used format, but these can be enzymatically processed to enable assay refinement. F(ab')_{2} fragments are generated by pepsin digestion to remove most of the Fc fragment, this avoids recognition by Fc receptors on live cells, or to Protein A or Protein G. Papain digestion generates Fab fragments, which removes the entire Fc fragment including the hinge region, yielding two monovalent Fab moieties. They can be used to block endogenous immunoglobulins on cells, tissues or other surfaces, and to block the exposed immunoglobulins in multiple labeling experiments using primary antibodies from the same species.

=== Applications ===
Secondary antibodies can be conjugated to enzymes such as horseradish peroxidase (HRP) or alkaline phosphatase (AP); or fluorescent dyes such as fluorescein isothiocyanate (FITC), rhodamine derivatives, Alexa Fluor dyes; or other molecules to be used in various applications. Secondary antibodies are used in many biochemical assays including:

- ELISA, including many HIV tests
- Western blot
- Immunostaining
- Immunohistochemistry
- Immunocytochemistry

== See also ==
- Aptamer – Oligonucleotide or peptide molecules that bind specific targets
