= Immunocytochemistry =

Interaction of chemicals with immune responses of cells

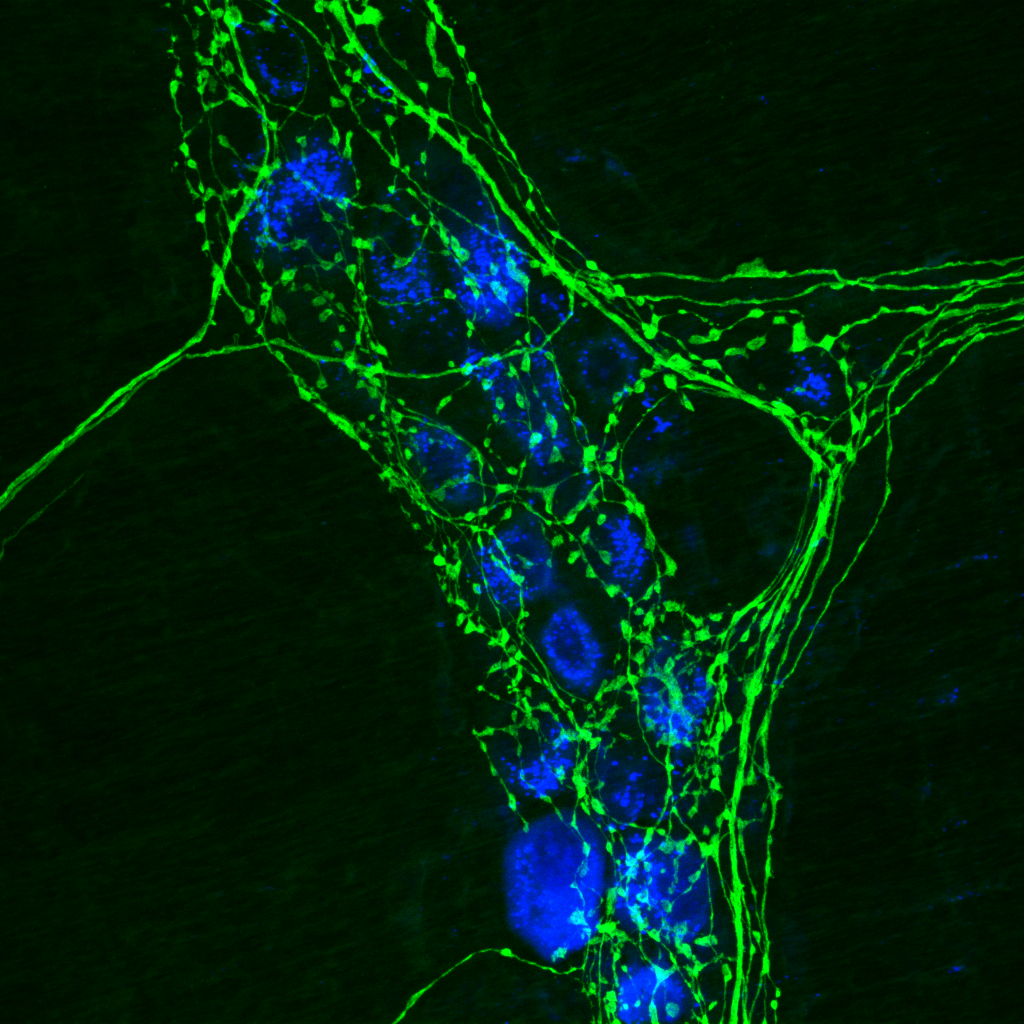
Immunocytochemistry labels individual proteins within cells, such as TH (green) in the axons of sympathetic autonomic neurons.

Immunocytochemistry (ICC) is a common laboratory technique that is used to anatomically visualize the localization of a specific protein or antigen in cells by use of a specific primary antibody that binds to it. The primary antibody allows visualization of the protein under a fluorescence microscope when it is bound by a secondary antibody that has a conjugated fluorophore. ICC allows researchers to evaluate whether or not cells in a particular sample express the antigen in question. In cases where an immunopositive signal is found, ICC also allows researchers to determine which sub-cellular compartments are expressing the antigen.

== Immunocytochemistry vs. immunohistochemistry ==
Immunocytochemistry differs from immunohistochemistry in that the former is performed on samples of intact cells that have had most, if not all, of their surrounding extracellular matrix removed. This includes individual cells that have been isolated from a block of solid tissue, cells grown in adherent or suspension culture,, or cells taken from a smear. In contrast, immunohistochemical samples are sections of biological tissue, where each cell is surrounded by tissue architecture and other cells normally found in the intact tissue. Immunocytochemistry is a technique used to assess the presence of a specific protein or antigen in cells (cultured cells, cell suspensions) by use of a specific antibody, which binds to it, thereby allowing visualization and examination under a microscope. It is a valuable tool for the determination of cellular contents from individual cells. Samples that can be analyzed include blood smears, aspirates, swabs, cultured cells, and cell suspensions.

There are many ways to prepare cell samples for immunocytochemical analysis. Each method has its own strengths and unique characteristics so the right method can be chosen for the desired sample and outcome.

Cells to be stained can be attached to a solid support to allow easy handling in subsequent procedures. This can be achieved by several methods: adherent cells may be grown on microscope slides, coverslips, or an optically suitable plastic support. Suspension cells can be centrifuged onto glass slides (cytospin), bound to solid support using chemical linkers, or in some cases handled in suspension.

Concentrated cellular suspensions that exist in a low-viscosity medium make good candidates for smear preparations. Dilute cell suspensions existing in a dilute medium are best suited for the preparation of cytospins through cytocentrifugation. Cell suspensions that exist in a high-viscosity medium, are best suited to be tested as swab preparations. The constant among these preparations is that the whole cell is present on the slide surface. For any intracellular reaction to take place, immunoglobulin must first traverse the cell membrane that is intact in these preparations. Reactions taking place in the nucleus can be more difficult, and the extracellular fluids can create unique obstacles in the performance of immunocytochemistry. In this situation, permeabilizing cells using detergent (Triton X-100 or Tween-20) or choosing organic fixatives (acetone, methanol, or ethanol) becomes necessary.

Antibodies are an important tool for demonstrating both the presence and the subcellular localization of an antigen. Cell staining is a very versatile technique and, if the antigen is highly localized, can detect as few as a thousand antigen molecules in a cell. In some circumstances, cell staining may also be used to determine the approximate concentration of an antigen, especially by an image analyzer.

== Methods ==
There are many methods to obtain immunological detection on tissues, including those tied directly to primary antibodies or antisera. A direct method involves the use of a detectable tag (e.g., fluorescent molecule, gold particles, etc., ) directly to the antibody that is then allowed to bind to the antigen (e.g., protein) in a cell.

Alternatively, there are many indirect methods. In one such method, the antigen is bound by a primary antibody which is then amplified by use of a secondary antibody which binds to the primary antibody. Next, a tertiary reagent containing an enzymatic moiety is applied and binds to the secondary antibody. When the quaternary reagent, or substrate, is applied, the enzymatic end of the tertiary reagent converts the substrate into a pigment reaction product, which produces a color (many colors are possible; brown, black, red, etc.,) in the same location that the original primary antibody recognized that antigen of interest.

Some examples of substrates used (also known as chromogens) are AEC (3-Amino-9-EthylCarbazole), or DAB (3,3'-Diaminobenzidine). Use of one of these reagents after exposure to the necessary enzyme (e.g., horseradish peroxidase conjugated to an antibody reagent) produces a positive immunoreaction product. Immunocytochemical visualization of specific antigens of interest can be used when a less specific stain like H&E (Hematoxylin and Eosin) cannot be used for a diagnosis to be made or to provide additional predictive information regarding treatment (in some cancers, for example).

Alternatively the secondary antibody may be covalently linked to a fluorophore (FITC and Rhodamine are the most common) which is detected in a fluorescence or confocal microscope. The location of fluorescence will vary according to the target molecule, external for membrane proteins, and internal for cytoplasmic proteins. In this way immunofluorescence is a powerful technique when combined with confocal microscopy for studying the location of proteins and dynamic processes (exocytosis, endocytosis, etc.).

== Sources ==
- Renshaw, Simon (2017). Immunohistochemistry and Immunocytochemistry: Essential Methods (2nd ed.). Wiley. ISBN 978-1-118-71775-2.
