= MIQE =

Protocols for reporting qPCR experiments

The Minimum Information for Publication of Quantitative Real-Time PCR Experiments (MIQE) guidelines are a set of protocols for conducting and reporting quantitative real-time PCR experiments and data, as devised by Stephen Bustin, Michael Pfaffl, Mikael Kubista and coworkers in 2009. They were devised after a paper was published in 2002 that claimed to detect measles virus in children with autism through the use of RT-qPCR, but the results proved to be completely unreproducible by other scientists. The authors themselves also did not try to reproduce them and the raw data was found to have a large amount of errors and basic mistakes in analysis. This incident prompted Stephen Bustin to create the MIQE guidelines to provide a baseline level of quality for qPCR data published in scientific literature.

== Purpose ==
The MIQE guidelines were created due to the low quality of qPCR data submitted to academic journals at the time, which was only becoming more common as Next Generation Sequencing machinery allowed for such experiments to be run for a cheaper cost. Because the technique is utilized across all of science in multiple fields, the instruments, methods, and designs of how qPCR is used differ greatly. To help improve overall quality, the MIQE guidelines were made as generalized suggestions on basic experimental procedures and forms of data that should be collected as a minimum level of reported information for other researchers to understand and use when reading the published material. Setting up a recognized and largely agreed upon set of guidelines such as these were deemed important by the scientific community especially due to the ever increasing amount of scientific work coming from developing countries with many different languages and protocols.

== History ==
=== Original version developments ===
In 2009, Stephen Bustin led an international group of scientists including professors Mikael Kubista and Michael Pfaffl to put together a set of guidelines on how to perform qPCR and what forms of data should be collected and published in the process. This also allowed editors and reviewers of scientific journals to employ the guidelines when looking over a submitted paper that included qPCR data. Thus, the guidelines were set up as a sort of checklist for each step of the procedure with certain items being marked as essential (E) when submitting data for publication and others marked as just desirable (D).

An additional version of the guidelines was published in September 2010 for use with fluorescence-based quantitative real-time PCR. It also acted as a précis for the broader form of the guidelines. Other researchers have been creating further versions for specific forms of qPCR that may require a supplementary or different set of items to check, including single-cell qPCR and digital PCR (dPCR). Appropriate adherence to the existing MIQE guidelines has also been overviewed in other scientific areas, including photobiomodulation and clinical biomarkers.

It was noted by Bustin in 2014 (and again by him in 2017) that there was some amount of uptake and usage of the MIQE guidelines within the scientific community, but there were still far too many published papers with qPCR experiments that lacked even the most basic of data presentation and proper confirmation of effectiveness for said data. These studies retained major reproducibility issues, where the conclusions of their evidence could not be replicated by other researchers, throwing the initial results into doubt. All of this was despite many papers directly citing Bustin's original MIQE publication, but not following through on the guideline checklist of material in their own experiments. However, some researchers have pointed out at least some success, with a number of papers being rejected by academic journals for publication due to failing to pass MIQE checklists. Other studies have been retracted after the fact once their lack of proper data to pass the MIQE guidelines was noted and publicly pointed out to the journal editors.

=== Tightening of guidelines ===
When setting up their new comparative qPCR systems titled "Dots in Boxes" in 2017, New England Biolabs stated that they had designed the data collection portion around the MIQE guidelines so that the data fit all the minimum parameter checklists in the protocols. Other scientific instrument companies have assisted in guideline compliance by purposefully tailoring their devices for them, including Bio-Rad creating a mobile app that allows for active marking of the MIQE checklist as each step is completed.

An overview of the 10th anniversary since the publication of the MIQE guidelines was conducted in June 2020 and discussed the scientific studies that had produced better and more organized results when following the guidelines. In August 2020, an updated version of the guidelines for the digital PCR method was published to account for improvement in machinery, technologies, and techniques since the original 2013 release. Additional guideline steps were added for data analysis, while also providing a more simplified checklist table for researchers to use. An RT-qPCR targeting assay was developed alongside Stephen Bustin using the MIQE guidelines for clinical biomarkers in December 2020 in order to identify the clinical presence of COVID-19 viral particles during the COVID-19 pandemic.

== Guidelines overview ==
The MIQE guidelines are split up into 9 different sections that make up the checklist. These include not only considerations for doing the qPCR itself, but also how the resulting data is collected, analyzed, and presented. An important part of the latter is including information relating to the analysis software used and also submitting the raw data to the relevant databases.

=== Experimental design ===
Large portions of the guidelines include basic actions that would normally be included in experiments and publications regardless, such as an item for describing the experimental and control group differences. Other such information includes how many individual units are used in each group in the experiment. These two pieces are defined as essential for any study. This section also includes two desirable points, which are pointing out whether the author's laboratory itself or a core laboratory of the university or organization conducted the qPCR assay and an acknowledgement of any other individuals that contributed to the work.

=== Sample ===
The essential requirements that samples and sample material must meet includes a description of the sample, what form of dissection was used, what processing method was done, whether the samples were frozen or fixed and how long did it take, and what sample conditions were used. It is also desirable to know the volume or mass of the sample that was processed for the qPCR.

=== Nucleic acid extraction ===
For the process of extracting the DNA/RNA, there are a number of essential guidelines. This includes a description of the extraction process done, a statement on what DNA extraction kit was used and any changes made to the directions, details on whether any DNase or RNase treatment was used, a statement on whether any contamination was assessed, a quantification of the amount of genetic material extracted, a description of the instruments used for the extraction, the methods used to retain RNA integrity, a statement on the RNA integrity number and quality indicator and the quantification cycle (Cq) reached, and lastly what testing was done to determine the presence or absence of inhibitors. Four desired pieces of information are where the reagents used were obtained from, what level of genetic purity was obtained, what yield was obtained, and an electrophoresis gel image for confirmation.

=== Reverse transcription ===
The primary essential parts for this phase include detailing the reaction conditions in full, giving both the amount of RNA used and the total volume of the reaction, give information on the oligonucleotide used as a primer and its concentration, the concentration and type of reverse transcriptase used, and lastly the temperature and amount of time done for the reaction. It is also desirable to have the catalog numbers of reagents used and their manufacturers, the standard deviation for the Cq with and without the transcriptase being involved, and how the cDNA was stored.

=== qPCR target information ===
All of the basic information regarding the target is necessary here, including the gene symbol, the accession database number for the sequence in question, the length of the sequence being amplified, information about the specificity screen used such as BLAST, what splicing variants exist for the sequence, and where the exon or intron for each primer is. There are several desired, but not required information pieces for this section, such as the location of the amplicon, whether any pseudogenes or homologs exist, whether a sequence alignment was done and the data obtained from it, and any data on the secondary structure of the amplified sequence.

=== qPCR oligonucleotides ===
Creation of the oligonucleotides requires only two pieces of essential information: the primer sequences used and the location and details of any modifications made to the sequence. But there are several desirable pieces of data, including the identification number from the RTPrimerDB database, the sequences from the probes, the manufacturer used to make the oligos, and how they were purified.

=== qPCR protocol ===
As one of the primary segments of the guidelines, there are several essential parts on the checklist for the qPCR process itself. This includes the full set of conditions used for the reaction, the volume of both the reaction and the cDNA, the concentrations for the probes, magnesium ions, and dNTPs, what kind of polymerase was used and its concentration, what kit was used and its manufacturer, what additives to the reaction were used, who manufactured the qPCR machine, and what parameters were set for the thermocycling process. The only additional desired pieces of information are the chemical composition of the buffer used, who manufactured the plates and tubes used and what their catalog number is, and whether the reaction was set up manually or by a machine.

=== qPCR validation ===
In order to confirm the effectiveness and quality of the qPCR process that was performed, there are several actions and subsequent data that must be presented. This includes explaining the specific method of checking that the process functioned, such as using a gel, direct sequencing of the genetic material, showing a melt profile, or from digestion by restriction enzyme. If SYBR Green I was used, then the Cq of the control group with no template DNA must be given.

Further essential data includes the calibration of the machine curves with the slope and y intercept noted, the efficiency of the PCR process as determined from the aforementioned slope, the correlation coefficients (r squared) for the calibration curves, the dynamic range of the linear curves, the Cq found at the lowest concentration where 95% of the results were still positive (LOD) along with the evidence for the LOD itself, and lastly if a multiplex is used, then the efficiency and LOD must be given for each assay done. As an addition to LOD determination, the limit of quantification (LOQ) should also be determined for diagnostic assays following the ISO standard and for drug development following the recommendations in the AAPS white paper by Hays et al. These calculations are based on the analysis of replicates in a standard curve.

The extra desired information includes evidence given that qPCR optimization occurred by the use of gradients, the confidence intervals to show efficiency of the qPCR, and the confidence intervals for the entire range tested.

=== Data analysis ===
The final section of the guidelines involves information on how the analysis of the qPCR data was done. The essential parts of that include the program and program version used for the analysis, the method for how the Cq was determined, figuring out the outlier points in the data and how they are used or excluded and why, what results were found for the controls with no template genetic material, an explanation for why the reference genes used were chosen and why the number of them was chosen, the method used to normalize the data, how many technical replicates were included, how repeatable was the data within the assays, what methods were used to determine significance of the results, and what software was used for this part of the qualitative analysis.

It is also desired to include information on the number of biological replicates and whether they matched the results from the technical replicates, the reproducibility data for the concentration variants, data on the power analysis, and lastly for the researchers to submit the raw data in the RDML file format.
