= Cycling probe technology =

Cycling probe technology (CPT) is a molecular biological technique for detecting specific DNA sequences. CPT operates under isothermal conditions. In some applications, CPT offers an alternative to PCR. However, unlike PCR, CPT does not generate multiple copies of the target DNA itself, and the amplification of the signal is linear, in contrast to the exponential amplification of the target DNA in PCR. CPT uses a sequence specific chimeric probe which hybridizes to a complementary target DNA sequence and becomes a substrate for RNase H. Cleavage occurs at the RNA internucleotide linkages and results in dissociation of the probe from the target, thereby making it available for the next probe molecule. Integrated electrokinetic systems have been developed for use in CPT.

== Probe ==
Cycling probe technology makes use of a chimeric nucleic acid probe to detect the presence of a particular DNA sequence. The chimeric probe consists of an RNA segment sandwiched between two DNA segments. The RNA segment contains 4 contiguous purine nucleotides. The probes should be less than 30 nucleotides in length and designed to minimize intra-probe and inter-probe interactions.

== Process ==
Cycling probe technology utilizes a cyclic, isothermal process that begins with the hybridization of the chimeric probe with the target DNA. Once hybridized, the probe becomes a suitable substrate for RNase H. RNase H, an endonuclease, cleaves the RNA portion of the probe, resulting in two chimeric fragments. The melting temperature (T_{m}) of the newly cleaved fragments is lower than the melting temperature of original probe. Because the CPT reaction is isothermally kept just above the melting point of the original probe, the cleaved fragments dissociate from the target DNA. Once dissociated, the target DNA is free to hybridize with a new probe, beginning the cycle again.

After the fragments have been cleaved and dissociated, they become detectable. A common strategy for detecting the fragments involves fluorescence. With this method, a fluorescent marker is attached to the 5’ end of the probe and a quencher is attached to the 3’ end of the probe. When RNase H cleaves the probe, the quencher and fluorescent marker separate, increasing the intensity of the fluorescent marker. Cleaved fragments can alternatively be detected via amplification (e.g., PCR) or further modification to allow for other chemical means of detection.

When working with small concentrations of target DNA, the CPT protocol can be modified to increase specificity and efficiency. Increasing allotted time has been shown to improve probe cleavage efficiency. Both increasing RNase H concentrations and use of a probe that isn't prone to inter-probe and intra-probe interactions has been shown to increase specificity.

== Advantages ==
Because cycling probe technology does not involve the amplification of target DNA, CPT has a lower risk of cross contamination than PCR. In addition, CPT is faster than PCR and doesn't require a specialized thermocycler. CPT also does not require running CPT products on a gel.

== Disadvantages ==
CPT requires specialized chimeric probes, making CPT assays more expensive than PCR. Because CPT probes are so specific, a new probe must be designed for each unique assay, further increasing cost. Clinical implementation is hampered financially, but it is also limited by the possibility of samples containing nonspecific RNases other than RNase H.

== Applications ==
CPT can be used to detect specific DNA sequences and by extension specific genotypes. For example, CPT can be used to distinguish GMO produce from non-GMO produce. Clinically, CPT can be used as an alternative to cell culturing in order to detect antibacterial resistance of a pathogen.

CPT, at its core, detects whether a specific sequence is present in a sample. But because cleaved probes accumulate following linear rate kinetics, the amount of target DNA can be quantified. Consequently, CPT has been used to quantify the number of non-coding repeats in organisms.

CPT can be used in conjunction with other technologies, like molecular beacons and qPCR.
