= CT =

CT or ct may refer to:

== In arts and media ==
- c't (Computer Technik), a German computer magazine
- Carrick Times, Northern Irish newspaper
- Freelancer Agent Connecticut (C.T.), a fictional character in the web series Red vs. Blue
- Christianity Today, an American evangelical Christian magazine

== Businesses and organizations ==
- CT Corp, an Indonesian conglomerate
- CT Corporation, an umbrella brand for two businesses: CT Corporation and CT Liena
- C/T Group, formerly Crosby Textor Group, social research and political polling company
- Canadian Tire, a Canadian company engaged in retailing, financial services and petroleum
- Calgary Transit, the public transit service in Calgary, Alberta, Canada
- Central Trains (National Rail abbreviation), a former train operating company in the United Kingdom
- Czech Television, the public television broadcaster in the Czech Republic
- Community Transit, the public transit service in Snohomish County, Washington, U.S.
- Comunión Tradicionalista, a former Spanish political party
- CT (TV channel), a Filipino cable and satellite television network

== Finance ==
- Centime (ct), the French for "cent", used in English in several Francophone countries
- Stotinki (ст), the currency of Bulgaria

== Places ==
- CT postcode area, for Canterbury and surrounding areas in south-eastern England
- Connecticut (United States postal abbreviation)
- Province of Catania (vehicle registration code), Sicily, Italy
- Central African Republic (FIPS Pub 10-4 code and obsolete NATO diagram)
- Canton and Enderbury Islands (obsolete ISO 3166 country code), part of the Phoenix Islands in the Pacific Ocean
- Cape Town (capital city of the Western Cape, South Africa)
- Ct, for "Court"; a street suffix as used in the US

== Science and technology ==
=== Biology and medicine ===
- Haplogroup CT, Y-DNA haplogroup.
- CT scan or X-ray computed tomography, a medical imaging method
- Calcitonin (symbol CT), a hormone produced in the thyroid gland
- Calibrated automated thrombogram (CT or CAT), a coagulation test
- Cardiothoracic surgery, the field of medicine specializing in chest surgery
- Chemotype (ct.), a chemically distinct entity in a plant or microorganism
- Cognitive therapy, a type of psychotherapy
- Connective tissue, a type of biological tissue
- Chelation therapy
- Chemotherapy
- Cholera toxin, a toxic protein secreted by Vibrio cholerae
- Threshold Cycle (C_{t}), see cycle of quantification/qualification
- COVID-19 test

=== Computing ===
- Intel Ct, a SIMD multithreading programming model developed by Intel
- Certificate Transparency, in network security

=== Other uses in science and technology ===
- CT Value, in drinking water disinfection
- Threshold cycle (C_{t}), a measure in the cycle of quantification/qualification of a real-time polymerase chain reaction
- Carat (purity) (ct), a measure of the purity of gold and platinum alloys
- Carat (mass) (ct), a unit of mass used for measuring gems and pearls
- Continuous-time signal, a varying quantity (a signal) whose domain is a continuum
- Center tap, a wire that is connected halfway along one of the windings of a transformer, inductor or a resistor
- Compliant Tower, a deepwater offshore oil platform
- Convective temperature, in atmospheric science
- Current transformer, a kind of transformer used in the electrical power industry
- Contraterrene, an obsolete word describing antimatter

== Transportation ==
- Lexus CT, an automobile
- Honda CT series, a series of Honda bikes
- Crawler-transporter, a tracked vehicle used to transport the Space Shuttle from Vehicle Assembly Building to Launch Complex 39
- Civil Air Transport (IATA code)
- Training cruiser, a U.S. Navy hull classification
- Cybertruck

== Other uses ==
- Ct, a typographic ligature
- c. t. (cum tempore, Latin for "with time"), indicates that a lecture will begin a quarter-hour after the stated time; see Academic quarter
- Central Time Zone, a time zone in Canada, the United States, and Mexico
- Coffin Texts
- Conspiracy theory or theorist
- Counter-terrorism
- Cryptologic technician, a United States Navy enlisted rating or job specialty
- Chinese Taipei, the name used by Taiwan in some international organizations due to political pressure from the People's Republic of China
- ct following a number means the number of items contained in a package (e.g. zucchini 3 ct); abbreviation of 'count'
- Corps Turd, etymologically "Cadet in Training", member of the Texas A&M Corps of Cadets that is not in the band

== See also ==
- Champions Trophy (disambiguation), several trophies awarded in different sports
- Central tendon (disambiguation)
