= RT PCR =

RT PCR may refer to:

- Real-time polymerase chain reaction
- Reverse transcription polymerase chain reaction (RT-PCR)
