= Dissociation curve =

Dissociation curve may refer to:

- Ligand (biochemistry)#Receptor/ligand binding affinity represented in a graph
- Oxygen-haemoglobin dissociation curve, a graphical representation of oxygen release from haemoglobin
- Melting curve analysis, a biochemical technique relying on heat-dependent dissociation between two DNA strands
