= Champions Trophy (disambiguation) =

The ICC Champions Trophy is an international cricket tournament organised by the International Cricket Council.

Champions Trophy could also refer to:

- Hockey Champions Trophy, an international field hockey tournament
- Men's Asian Champions Trophy, a men's Asian field hockey tournament
- Women's Asian Champions Trophy, a women's Asian field hockey tournament
- Champions Trophy (real tennis), an annual real tennis tournament

== See also ==
- CT (disambiguation)
- Cricket World Cup (disambiguation)
