= Quantitative PCR instrument =

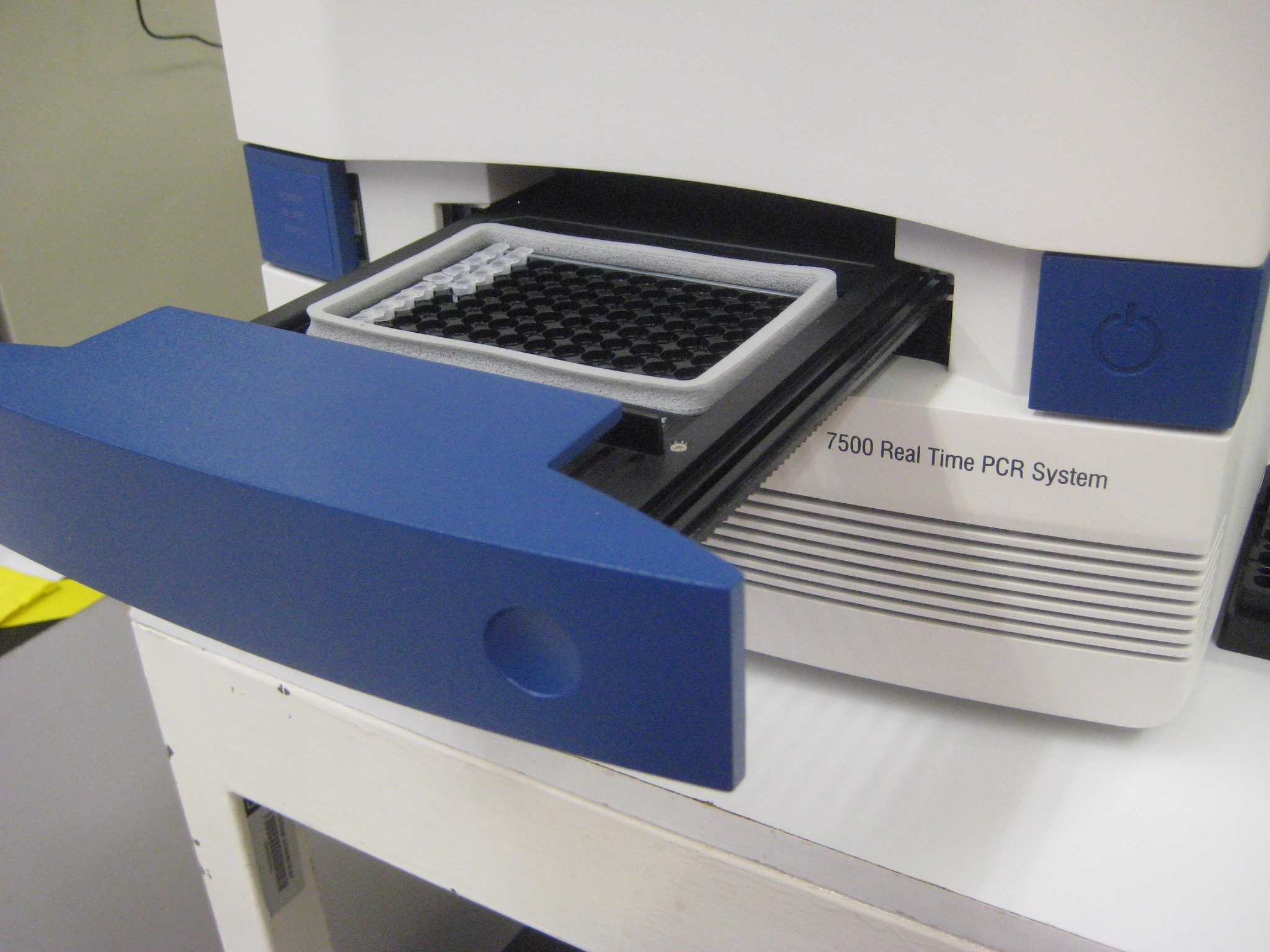
A real-time PCR cycler from Applied Biosystems

A quantitative PCR instrument, also called real-time PCR machine, is an analytical instrument that amplifies and detects DNA. It combines the functions of a thermal cycler and a fluorimeter, enabling the process of quantitative PCR. Quantitative PCR instruments detect fluorescent signals produced during DNA amplification, which correlate with the amount of DNA generated. This allows for precise quantification of specific DNA present in a sample. These instruments are used in many applications, including gene expression analysis, detection of genetic variations, genotyping, and diagnostics of bacterial and viral pathogens.

The first quantitative PCR machine was described in 1993, and two commercial models became available in 1996. By 2009, eighteen different models were offered by seven different manufacturers. Prices range from about 4,500 to 150,000 USD. Many configurations of real-time PCR instruments became available on the market, with most commonly used systems designed to accommodate 96- or 384-well plates. Principal performance dimensions include thermal control, fluorescence detection (fluorimetry), and sample throughput.

A quantitative PCR instrument is usually equipped with integrated software for real-time data acquisition and analysis, including quantification, melting curve analysis, and quality control metrics. Most systems use Peltier-based thermal blocks.

== Thermal control ==
Efficient performance of quantitative PCR requires rapid, precise, thermal control.

30 cycles of PCR have been demonstrated in less than 10 minutes. Rapid cycling provides several benefits, including, reduced time to result, increased system throughput and improved reaction specificity. In practice however, engineering trade-offs between ease of use, temperature uniformity, and speed, mean that reaction times are typically more than 25 minutes.

Thermal non-uniformity during temperature cycling contributes to variability in PCR and, unfortunately, some thermocyclers do not meet the specifications claimed by manufacturers. Increasing the speed of thermal cycling generally reduces thermal uniformity, and can reduce the precision of quantitative PCR.

The temperature uniformity also has a direct effect on the ability to discriminate different PCR products by performing melting point analysis. In addition to uniformity, the resolution with which instruments are able to control temperature is a factor which affects their performance when performing high resolution melting analyses.

Therefore, speed, precision and uniformity of thermal control are important performance characteristics of quantitative PCR instruments.

== Fluorimetry ==
Quantitative PCR instruments monitor the progress of PCR, and the nature of amplified products, by measuring fluorescence.

The range of different fluorescent labels that can be monitored, the precision with which they can be measured, and the ability to discriminate signals from different labels, are relevant performance characteristics.

By using an instrument with sufficient optical channels and extensive assay optimisation, up to 7 separate targets can be simultaneously quantified in a single PCR reaction. However, even with extensive optimisation, the effective dynamic range of such multiplex assays is often reduced due to interference between the constituent reactions.

The noise in fluorescence measurements affects the precision of qPCR. It is typically a function of excitation source intensity variation, detector noise and mechanical noise. Multi factorial analysis has suggested that the contribution of mechanical noise is the most important factor, and that systems with no moving parts in their optical paths are likely to provide improved quantitative precision.

In addition, when performing high resolution melting analyses, one factor that affects the sensitivity of heteroduplex detection is fluorimetric precision.

Therefore, the number of optical channels and the level of noise in fluorescence measurements are also important performance characteristics of quantitative PCR instruments.

== See also ==
- Real-time PCR
