= Webtag =

Bioinformatics web tool

Webtag is an on-line bioinformatics tool providing oligonucleotide sequences (usually called tags or anchors) that are absent from a specified genome. These tags can be appended to gene specific primers for reverse transcriptase polymerase chain reaction (RT-PCR) experiments, circumventing genomic DNA contamination.

== Background ==
RT-PCR is a technique used for the detection of even very low copy mRNA transcripts. The sensitivity of the technique also makes it susceptible to DNA contamination. Since PCR is unable to distinguish between cDNA targets and genomic DNA contamination, false positives and/or erroneous quantitative results are possible.

In order to overcome genomic DNA contamination in transcriptional studies, reverse template-specific polymerase chain reaction, a modification of RT-PCR is used. The possibility of using tags whose sequences are not found in the genome further improves reverse specific polymerase chain reaction experiments. The use of anchors, or tags, in the 5' region of a gene specific primer or poly-T tail allows for RNA-specific amplification, and constitutes a viable strategy. Techniques such as RS-PCR and (EXACT) RT-PCR are based on the integration of such tags (unique sequences not present in genomic DNA) in the 5' end of the first strand cDNA, permitting RNA-specific amplification without loss of sensitivity.

== Webtag ==
This web based service builds on the Tagenerator tool, but is very fast because all tags are pre-generated and stored in a database. It is also a significant improvement since Webtag takes into account the interactions of the tag with the primers to be used in the experiment. Having it as a web based service also means that the molecular biologist doesn't have to download and install software with all the dependencies on their own computer.

Webtag generates tags that combine genome absence with good priming properties for RT-PCR based experiments. The use of such tags will deliberately not result in PCR amplification of genomic DNA, permitting the exclusive amplification of cDNA, therefore circumventing the effects of genomic DNA contamination in an RNA sample.
