= Polymerase chain reaction inhibitors =

Factors preventing PCR amplification

PCR inhibitors are any factor which prevent the amplification of nucleic acids through the polymerase chain reaction (PCR). PCR inhibition is the most common cause of amplification failure when sufficient copies of DNA are present. PCR inhibitors usually affect PCR through interaction with DNA or interference with the DNA polymerase. Inhibitors can escape removal during the DNA purification procedure by binding directly to single or double-stranded DNA. Alternatively, by reducing the availability of cofactors (such as Mg^{2+}) or otherwise interfering with their interaction with the DNA polymerase, PCR is inhibited.

In a multiplex PCR reaction, it is possible for the different sequences to suffer from different inhibition effects to different extents, leading to disparity in their relative amplifications.

== Types of inhibitors ==
Inhibitors may be present in the original sample, such as blood, fabrics, tissues and soil but may also be added as a result of the sample processing and DNA extraction techniques used. Excess salts including KCl and NaCl, ionic detergents such as sodium deocycholate, sarkosyl and SDS, ethanol, isopropanol and phenol among others, all contribute via various inhibitory mechanisms, to the reduction of PCR efficiency.

== Quantifying extent of inhibition ==
In order to try to assess the extent of inhibition that occurs in a reaction, a control can be performed by adding a known amount of a template to the investigated reaction mixture (based on the sample under analysis). By comparing the amplification of this template in the mixture to the amplification observed in a separate experiment in which the same template is used in the absence of inhibitors, the extent of inhibition in the investigated reaction mixture can be inferred. Of course, if any part of the inhibition occurring in the sample-derived reaction mixture is sequence-specific, then this method will yield an underestimate of the inhibition as it applies to the investigate sequence(s).

== Preventing PCR inhibition ==
=== Sample collection ===
The method of sample acquisition can be refined to avoid unnecessary collection of inhibitors. For example, in forensics, swab-transfer of blood on fabric or saliva on food, may prevent or reduce contamination with inhibitors present in the fabric or food.

=== DNA purification ===
Techniques exist and kits are commercially available to enable extraction of DNA to the exclusion of some inhibitors.

=== PCR reaction components ===
As well as methods for the removal of inhibitors from samples before PCR, some DNA polymerases offer varying resistance to different inhibitors and increasing the concentration of the chosen DNA polymerase also confers some resistance to polymerase-targeted inhibitors.

For PCR based on blood samples, the addition of bovine serum albumin reduces the effect of some inhibitors on PCR.

== See also ==
- PCR optimization
