= Touchdown polymerase chain reaction =

Type of PCR

The touchdown polymerase chain reaction or touchdown style polymerase chain reaction is a method of polymerase chain reaction by which primers avoid amplifying nonspecific sequences. The annealing temperature during a polymerase chain reaction determines the specificity of primer annealing. The melting point of the primer sets the upper limit on annealing temperature. At temperatures just above this point, only very specific base pairing between the primer and the template will occur. At lower temperatures, the primers bind less specifically. Nonspecific primer binding obscures polymerase chain reaction results, as the nonspecific sequences to which primers anneal in early steps of amplification will "swamp out" any specific sequences because of the exponential nature of polymerase amplification.

== Method ==
Scheme of touchdown PCR. The first annealing between primer and DNA occurs at the initial temperature, the second after the temperature has been lowered by $\Delta T$. Therefore, the product of the second annealing is disadvantaged by $2^{-1}$.

The earliest steps of a touchdown polymerase chain reaction cycle have high annealing temperatures. The annealing temperature is decreased in increments for every subsequent set of cycles. The primer will anneal at the highest temperature which is least-permissive of nonspecific binding that it is able to tolerate. Thus, the first sequence amplified is the one between the regions of greatest primer specificity; it is most likely that this is the sequence of interest. These fragments will be further amplified during subsequent rounds at lower temperatures, and will outcompete the nonspecific sequences to which the primers may bind at those lower temperatures. If the primer initially (during the higher-temperature phases) binds to the sequence of interest, subsequent rounds of polymerase chain reaction can be performed upon the product to further amplify those fragments. Touchdown increases specificity of the reaction at higher temperatures and increases the efficiency towards the end by lowering the annealing temperature.

From a mathematical point of view products of annealing at smaller temperatures are disadvantaged by $2^{i-j}$ for the first annealing in cycle $i$ and the second one in cycle $j$ for $i,j\in \mathbb N , i\geq j$.
