= Inverse polymerase chain reaction =

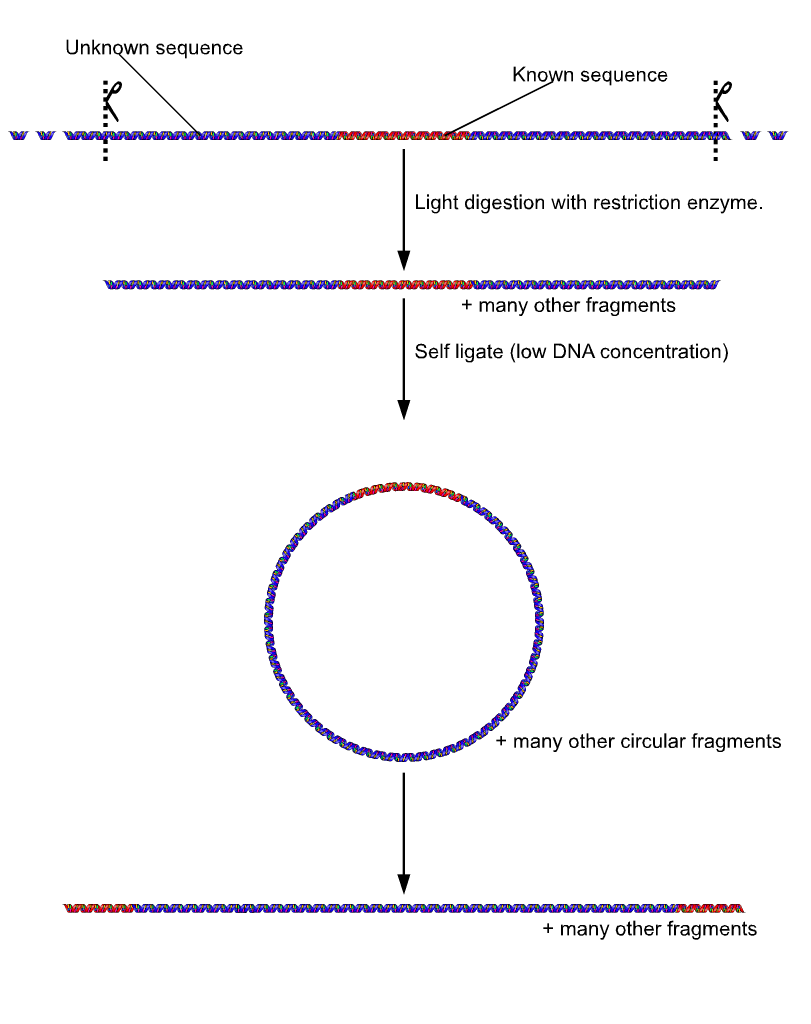
Summary of the inverse PCR process

Inverse polymerase chain reaction (inverse PCR) is a variant of the polymerase chain reaction that is used to amplify DNA with only one known sequence. One limitation of conventional PCR is that it requires primers complementary to both termini of the target DNA, but this method allows PCR to be carried out even if only one sequence is available from which primers may be designed.

Inverse PCR is especially useful for the determination of insert locations. For example, various retroviruses and transposons randomly integrate into genomic DNA. To identify the sites where they have entered, the known, "internal" viral or transposon sequences can be used to design primers that will amplify a small portion of the flanking, "external" genomic DNA. The amplified product can then be sequenced and compared with DNA databases to locate the sequence which has been disrupted.

The inverse PCR method involves a series of restriction digests and ligation, resulting in a looped fragment that can be primed for PCR from a single section of known sequence. Then, like other polymerase chain reaction processes, the DNA is amplified by the thermostable DNA polymerase:

1. A target region with an internal section of known sequence and unknown flanking regions is identified
2. Genomic DNA is digested into fragments of a few kilobases by a usually low-moderate frequency (6-8 base) cutting restriction enzyme.
3. Under low DNA concentrations or quick ligation conditions, self-ligation is induced to give a circular DNA product.
4. PCR is carried out as usual with the circular template, with primers complementary to sections of the known internal sequence pointing outwards.

Finally the sequence of the sequenced PCR product is compared against sequence databases. It is used in case of chromosome crawling.
