= Helix-hairpin-helix =

Protein structural motif

helix–hairpin–helix DNA-binding domain
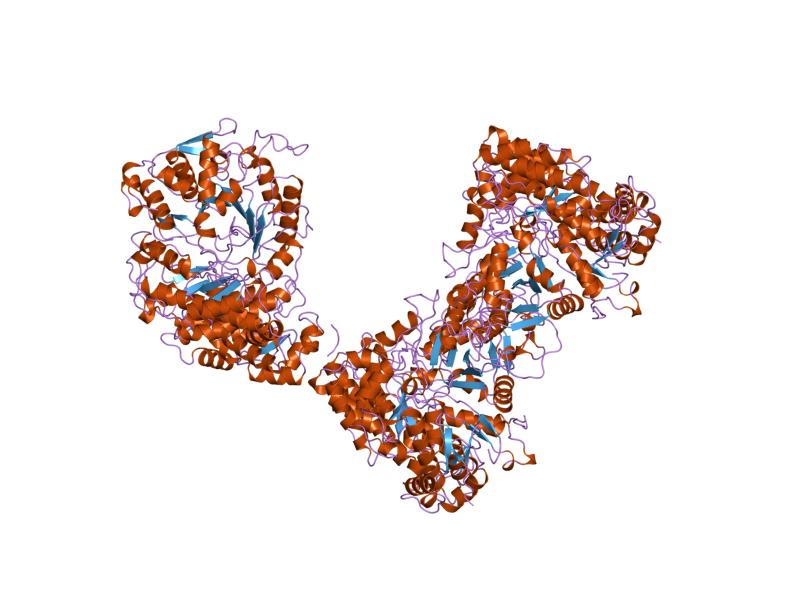
- Cartoon representation of the molecular structure of the Structure of human NTHL1 (PDB: 7rds)

Identifiers
- Symbol: HHH
- Pfam clan: CL0198
- ECOD: 102
- InterPro: IPR000445
Available protein structures:
- PDB: IPR000445
- AlphaFold: IPR000445

In molecular biology helix-hairpin-helix (HHH) is a DNA-binding protein structural motif found in proteins that interact with DNA in a non-sequence-specific manner.

== Structure ==
The helix-hairpin-helix motif consists of two anti-parallel α-helices connected by a short hairpin loop involved in interactions with DNA which usually contains a consensus glycine-hydrophobic amino acid-glycine sequence pattern (GhG). The two α-helices are packed at an acute angle of ~25–50° that dictates the characteristic pattern of hydrophobicity in the sequences, while other DNA-binding structures like the helix-turn-helix (HTH) motif, which is also formed by a pair of helices, can be easily distinguished by the packing of the helices at an almost right angle.

== Function ==
Many proteins containing the helix-hairpin-helix motif mediate non-sequence-specific DNA binding through hydrogen bonds between protein backbone nitrogens and DNA phosphate groups. The HHH motif differs from other DNA-binding motifs like helix-turn-helix, which typically bind DNA in a sequence-specific manner.

== Examples ==
The helix-hairpin-helix motif is found in a wide variety of proteins involved in DNA-related processes such as DNA synthesis, repair, recombination, and degradation. The HHH motif in these proteins typically functions as a non-sequence-specific DNA-binding module, allowing them to interact with the DNA sugar-phosphate backbone. Some of the proteins known to contain this motif include:

- DNA polymerases (e.g., rat polymerase β, Taq polymerase I)
- DNA repair enzymes (e.g., E. coli AlkA, E. coli endonuclease III)
- DNA ligases (e.g., NAD+-dependent DNA ligases)
- S13 ribosomal proteins
- DNA glycosylases
- RuvA (involved in DNA repair and recombination)
- Rad51 (involved in DNA repair and recombination)
- RNA polymerase α-subunit
- DNA helicases (e.g., PcrA)
- Nucleases
- DNA topoisomerase V

== Evolution and distribution ==
The helix-hairpin-helix motif likely emerged early in protein evolution as a simple structural solution for non-sequence-specific DNA interaction, utilising backbone hydrogen bonding to phosphate groups rather than base-specific contacts.
