= Melting curve analysis =

Interpretation of results of heating DNA

Melting curve analysis is an assessment of the dissociation characteristics of double-stranded DNA during heating. As the temperature is raised, the double strand begins to dissociate leading to a rise in the absorbance intensity, hyperchromicity. The temperature at which 50% of DNA is denatured is known as the melting temperature. Measurement of melting temperature can help identify species because every organism has a specific melting curve.

A greater proportion of G-C base pairs (as opposed to A-T base pairs) leads to a higher melting point. This is attributable to the more favorable stacking energies associated with dimers that involve G-C base pairs.

The information also gives vital clues to a molecule's mode of interaction with DNA. Molecules such as intercalators slot in between base pairs and interact through pi stacking. This has a stabilizing effect on DNA's structure which leads to a raise in its melting temperature. Likewise, increasing salt concentrations helps diffuse negative repulsions between the phosphates in the DNA's backbone. This also leads to a rise in the DNA's melting temperature. Conversely, pH can have a negative effect on DNA's stability which may lead to a lowering of its melting temperature.

== Implementation ==
Graphs to show the relation between fluorescence and temperature for labeled probe designed for a Wt sequence, homozygous Wt, heterozygous and homozygous mutant situations

The energy required to break the base-base hydrogen bonding between two strands of DNA is dependent on their length, GC content and their complementarity. By heating a reaction-mixture that contains double-stranded DNA sequences and measuring dissociation against temperature, these attributes can be inferred.

Originally, strand dissociation was observed using UV absorbance measurements, but techniques based on fluorescence measurements are now the most common approach.

The temperature-dependent dissociation between two DNA-strands can be measured using a DNA-intercalating fluorophore such as SYBR green, EvaGreen or fluorophore-labelled DNA probes. In the case of SYBR green (which fluoresces 1000-fold more intensely while intercalated in the minor groove of two strands of DNA), the dissociation of the DNA during heating is measurable by the large reduction in fluorescence that results. Alternatively, juxtapositioned probes (one featuring a fluorophore and the other, a suitable quencher) can be used to determine the complementarity of the probe to the target sequence.

The graph of the negative first derivative of the melting-curve may make it easier to pin-point the temperature of dissociation (defined as 50% dissociation), by virtue of the peaks thus formed.

SYBR Green enabled product differentiation in the LightCycler in 1997. Hybridization probes (or FRET probes) were also demonstrated to provide very specific melting curves from the single-stranded (ss) probe-to-amplicon hybrid. Idaho Technology and Roche have done much to popularize this use on the LightCycler instrument.

== Applications ==
Since the late 1990s product analysis via SYBR Green, other double-strand specific dyes, or probe-based melting curve analysis has become nearly ubiquitous. The probe-based technique is sensitive enough to detect single-nucleotide polymorphisms (SNP) and can distinguish between homozygous wildtype, heterozygous and homozygous mutant alleles by virtue of the dissociation patterns produced. Without probes, amplicon melting (melting and analysis of the entire PCR product) was not generally successful at finding single base variants through melting profiles. With higher resolution instruments and advanced dyes, amplicon melting analysis of one base variants is now possible with several commercially available instruments. For example: Applied Biosystems 7500 Fast System and the 7900HT Fast Real-Time PCR System, Idaho Technology's LightScanner (the first plate-based high resolution melting device), Qiagen's Rotor-Gene instruments, and Roche's LightCycler 480 instruments.

Many research and clinical examples exist in the literature that show the use of melting curve analysis to obviate or complement sequencing efforts, and thus reduce costs.

While most quantitative PCR machines have the option of melting curve generation and analysis, the level of analysis and software support varies. High Resolution Melt (known as either Hi-Res Melting, or HRM) is the advancement of this general technology and has begun to offer higher sensitivity for SNP detection within an entire dye-stained amplicon. It is less expensive and simpler in design to develop probeless melting curve systems. However, for genotyping applications, where large volumes of samples must be processed, the cost of development may be less important than the total throughput and ease of interpretation, thus favoring probe-based genotyping methods.

Digital high resolution melting (dHRM) is also used in conjunction with digital PCR (dPCR) to improve quantitative power by providing additional information on the melting behavior of the amplified DNA, which can help in distinguishing between different genetic variants and in ensuring the accuracy of the quantification. dHRM is enabled by the use of sensitive DNA-binding dyes and digital PCR instrumentation, which allows for the collection of high-density data points to generate detailed melt profiles. These profiles can be used to identify even subtle differences in nucleic acid sequences, making dHRM a powerful tool for genotyping, mutation scanning, and methylation analysis

dHRM is an advanced molecular technique used for the analysis of genetic variations, such as single nucleotide polymorphisms (SNPs), mutations, and methylations, by monitoring the melting behavior of double-stranded DNA. It is a post-PCR method that involves the gradual heating of PCR-amplified DNA in the presence of intercalating dyes that fluoresce when bound to double-stranded DNA. As the DNA melts, the fluorescence decreases, and the changes in fluorescence are monitored in real-time with digital PCR system. The resulting melting curves are then analyzed to detect genetic differences based on the melting temperatures of the DNA fragments.

The technique has been further advanced by its application on digital microfluidics platforms, which can facilitate the analysis of single-nucleotide polymorphisms (SNPs) with high accuracy and sensitivity. Additionally, massively parallel dHRM has been developed to enable rapid and absolutely quantitative sequence profiling, which can be particularly useful in clinical and industrial settings where accurate quantification of nucleic acids is critical.

== See also ==
- High Resolution Melt analysis
- Microscale thermophoresis, a method to determine the stability, the length, the conformation and the modifications of DNA and RNA
- Nucleic acid thermodynamics
