= Stephen Bustin =

British scientist

Stephen Andrew Bustin (born 1954) is a British scientist, former professor of molecular sciences at Queen Mary University of London from 2004 to 2012, as well as visiting professor at Middlesex University, beginning in 2006. In 2012 he was appointed Professor of Allied Health and Medicine at Anglia Ruskin University. He is known for his research into polymerase chain reaction.

== Education ==
Bustin obtained his B.A. and PhD from Trinity College, Dublin in molecular genetics.

== Career ==
In 2023, Bustin was elected a member of the Academia Europaea.

== Research ==
His research group's general areas of interest are the small and large bowel, as well as colorectal cancer with particular emphasis on investigating the process of invasion and metastasis. An important aim is to translate molecular techniques into clinical practice by including molecular parameters into clinical tumor staging. To this end, Bustin has published many papers on PCR techniques, in particular reverse transcription polymerase chain reaction, the subject of his most cited paper, published in 2000.

Bustin led a group who the MIQE guidelines in a 2009 paper published in Clinical Chemistry, the goal of which is to create guidelines for how PCR should be performed to ensure that PCR results are being reliably conducted and interpreted, as well as to make replication of experiments easier. This paper is the fifth most cited one ever to be published in Clinical Chemistry, with over 17000 citations on Google Scholar as of September 2025.

== Lundy murders testimony ==
Bustin testified in the trials pertaining to the Lundy murders in 2015, criticizing tests that had claimed to detect human brain cells on Mark Lundy's shirt.
