= Central tendon =

Central tendon can refer to:

- Central tendon of diaphragm
- Central tendon of perineum
