= Cricket World Cup (disambiguation) =

The Cricket World Cup is the world cup for men's One Day International cricket.

Cricket World Cup may also refer to:

- Women's Cricket World Cup, the world cup for women's One Day International cricket
- Men's T20 World Cup, the world cup for men's Twenty20 International cricket
- Women's T20 World Cup, the world cup for women's Twenty20 International cricket
