= Amplicon =

Piece of DNA or RNA obtained by amplification chain reactions (PCR, LCR)

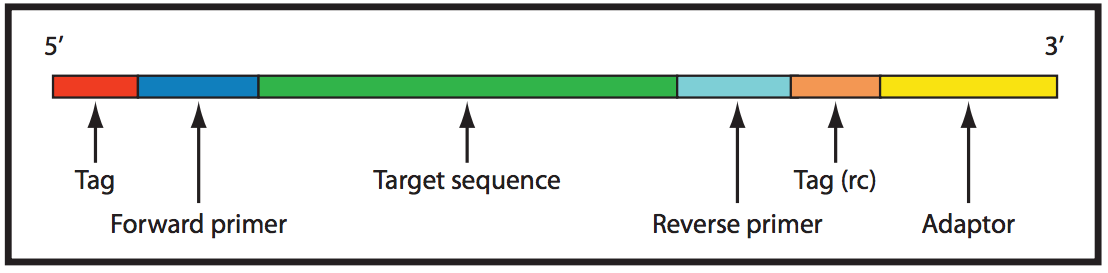
An amplicon sequence template that has been prepared for amplification. The target sequence to be amplified is colored green.

In molecular biology, an amplicon is a piece of DNA that is the source or product of amplification or replication events. It can be formed artificially, using various methods including polymerase chain reactions (PCR) or ligase chain reactions (LCR), or naturally through gene duplication. In this context, amplification refers to the production of one or more copies of a genetic fragment or target sequence, specifically the amplicon. As it refers to the product of an amplification reaction, amplicon is used interchangeably with common laboratory terms, such as "PCR product".

Artificial amplification is used in research, forensics, and medicine for purposes that include detection and quantification of infectious agents, identification of human remains, and extracting genotypes from human hair.

Natural gene duplication plays a major role in evolution. It is also implicated in several forms of human cancer including primary mediastinal B cell lymphoma and Hodgkin's lymphoma. In this context the term amplicon can refer both to a section of chromosomal DNA that has been excised, amplified, and reinserted elsewhere in the genome, and to a fragment of extrachromosomal DNA known as a double minute, each of which can be composed of one or more genes. Amplification of the genes encoded by these amplicons generally increases transcription of those genes and ultimately the volume of associated proteins.

== Structure ==
Amplicons in general are direct repeat (head-to-tail) or inverted repeat (head-to-head or tail-to-tail) genetic sequences, and can be either linear or circular in structure. Circular amplicons consist of imperfect inverted duplications annealed into a circle and are thought to arise from precursor linear amplicons.

During artificial amplification, amplicon length is dictated by the experimental goals.

== Technology ==
Analysis of amplicons has been made possible by the development of amplification methods such as PCR, and increasingly by cheaper and more high-throughput technologies for DNA sequencing or next-generation sequencing, such as ion semiconductor sequencing, popularly referred to as the brand of the developer, Ion Torrent.

DNA sequencing technologies such as next-generation sequencing have made it possible to study amplicons in genome biology and genetics, including cancer genetics research, phylogenetic research, and human genetics. For example, using the 16S rRNA gene, which is part of every bacterial and archaeal genome and is highly conserved, bacteria can be taxonomically classified by comparison of the amplicon sequence to known sequences. This works similarly in the fungal domain with the 18S rRNA gene as well as the ITS1 non-coding region.

Irrespective of the approach used to amplify the amplicons, some technique must be used to quantitate the amplified product. Generally, these techniques incorporate a capture step and a detection step, although how these steps are incorporated depends on the individual assay.

Examples include the Amplicor HIV-1 Monitor Assay (RT-PCR), which has the capacity to recognize HIV in plasma; the HIV-1 QT (NASBA), which is used to measure plasma viral load by amplifying a segment of the HIV RNA; and transcription mediated amplification, which employs a hybridization protection assay to distinguish Chlamydia trachomatis infections. Various detection and capture steps are involved in each approach to assess the amplification product, or amplicon. With amplicon sequencing the high number of different amplicons resulting from amplification of a usual sample are concatenated and sequenced. After quality control classification is done by different methods, the counts of identical taxa representing their relative abundance in the sample.

== Applications ==
PCR can be used to determine sex from a human DNA sample. The loci of Alu element insertion is selected, amplified and evaluated in terms of size of the fragment. The sex assay utilizes AluSTXa for the X chromosome, AluSTYa for the Y chromosome, or both AluSTXa and AluSTYa, to reduce the possibility of error to a negligible quantity. The inserted chromosome yields a large fragment when the homologous region is amplified. The males are distinguished as having two DNA amplicons present, while females have only a single amplicon. The kit adapted for carrying out the method includes a pair of primers to amplify the locus and optionally polymerase chain reaction reagents.

LCR can be used to diagnose tuberculosis. The sequence containing protein antigen B is targeted by four oligonucleotide primers—two for the sense strand, and two for the antisense strand. The primers bind adjacent to one another, forming a segment of double stranded DNA that once separated, can serve as a target for future rounds of replication. In this instance, the product can be detected via the microparticle enzyme immunoassay (MEIA).

== See also ==
- DNA polymerase
- High Resolution Melt
- Melting curve analysis
- Molecular biology
