= Cycle of quantification/qualification =

Signal over cycles. When the threshold is crossed by the signal C_{q} can be determined.

Cycle of quantification/qualification (C_{q}) is a parameter used in real-time polymerase chain reaction techniques, indicating the cycle number where a PCR amplification curve meets a predefined mathematical criterion. A C_{q} may be used for quantification of the target sequence or to determine whether the target sequence is present or not.

Two criteria to determine the C_{q} are used by different thermocyclers: threshold cycle (C_{t}) is the number of cycles required for the fluorescent signal to cross a given value threshold. Usually, the threshold is set above the baseline, about 10 times the standard deviation of the noise of the baseline, to avoid random effects on the C_{t}. However, the threshold shouldn't be set much higher than that to avoid reduced reproducibility due to uncontrolled factors.

Crossing point (Cp) and Take off point (TOP) are the cycle value of the maximum second derivative of the amplification curve.
