= Molecular beacon =

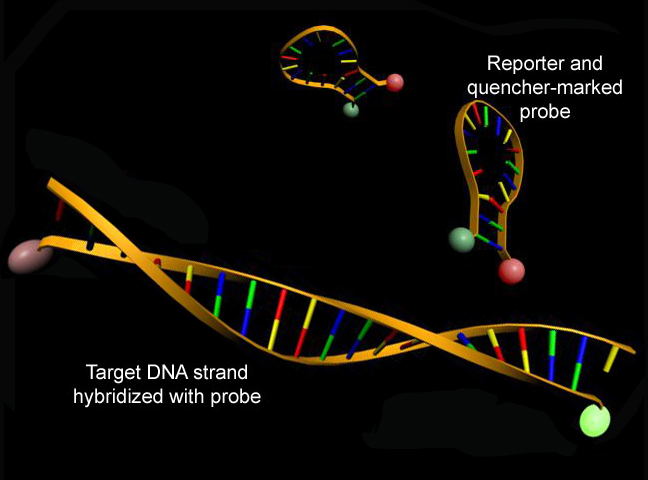
Structure of molecular beacons in their native conformations (top) or hybridized with a DNA strand (bottom)

Molecular beacons, or molecular beacon probes, are oligonucleotide hybridization probes that can report the presence of specific nucleic acids in homogenous solutions. Molecular beacons are hairpin-shaped molecules with an internally quenched fluorophore whose fluorescence is restored when they bind to a target nucleic acid sequence. This is a novel non-radioactive method for detecting specific sequences of nucleic acids. They are useful in situations where it is either not possible or desirable to isolate the probe-target hybrids from an excess of the hybridization probes.

== Molecular beacon probes ==
The structure of a typical molecular beacon probe

A typical molecular beacon probe is 25 nucleotides long. The middle 15 nucleotides are complementary to the target DNA or RNA and do not base pair with one another, while the five nucleotides at each terminus are complementary to each other rather than to the target DNA. A typical molecular beacon structure can be divided in 4 parts: 1) loop, an 18–30 base pair region of the molecular beacon that is complementary to the target sequence; 2) stem formed by the attachment to both termini of the loop of two short (5 to 7 nucleotide residues) oligonucleotides that are complementary to each other; 3) 5' fluorophore at the 5' end of the molecular beacon, a fluorescent dye is covalently attached; 4) 3' quencher (non fluorescent) dye that is covalently attached to the 3' end of the molecular beacon. When the beacon is in closed loop shape, the quencher resides in proximity to the fluorophore, which results in quenching the fluorescent emission of the latter.

If the nucleic acid to be detected is complementary to the strand in the loop, the event of hybridization occurs. The duplex formed between the nucleic acid and the loop is more stable than that of the stem because the former duplex involves more base pairs. This causes the separation of the stem and hence of the fluorophore and the quencher. Once the fluorophore is no longer next to the quencher, illumination of the hybrid with light results in the fluorescent emission. The presence of the emission reports that the event of hybridization has occurred and hence the target nucleic acid sequence is present in the test sample.

== Use in Cell Engineering ==
Fluorogenic signaling oligonucleotide probes were reported for use to detect and isolate cells expressing one or more desired genes, including the production of multigene stable cell lines expressing heteromultimeric epithelial sodium channel (αβγ-ENaC), sodium voltage-gated ion channel 1.7 (NaV1.7-αβ1β2), four unique γ-aminobutyric acid A (GABAA) receptor ion channel subunit combinations α1β3γ2s, α2β3γ2s, α3β3γ2s and α5β3γ2s, cystic fibrosis conductance regulator (CFTR), CFTR-Δ508 and two G-protein coupled receptors (GPCRs).

== Synthesis ==
Molecular beacons are synthetic oligonucleotides whose preparation is well documented. In addition to the conventional set of nucleoside phosphoramidites, the synthesis also requires a solid support derivatized with a quencher and a phosphoramidite building block designed for the attachment of a protected fluorescent dye.

The first use of the term molecular beacons, synthesis and demonstration of function was in 1996.

== Alternative homogeneous assay technologies ==
- 5'-nuclease TaqMan assay
- Exciton-controlled hybridization-sensitive fluorescent oligonucleotide (ECHO) probes.
- Dual Hybridization (LightCycler®) probes
- Scorpions® Probes
- LUX (Light Upon Extension) Probes
- DNA binding dye assays (e.g., SYBR Green, SYTO9, Melt Doctor, LCGreen Plus, etc.)

== Applications ==
- SNP detection
- Real-time nucleic acid detection
- Real-time PCR quantification
- Allelic discrimination and identification
- Splicing product detection (for example, detection of the ligated exon sequence generated by self-splicing group I and group II introns)
- Multiplex PCR assays
- Diagnostic clinical assays
