= Mikael Kubista =

Czech-born Swedish chemist and entrepreneur

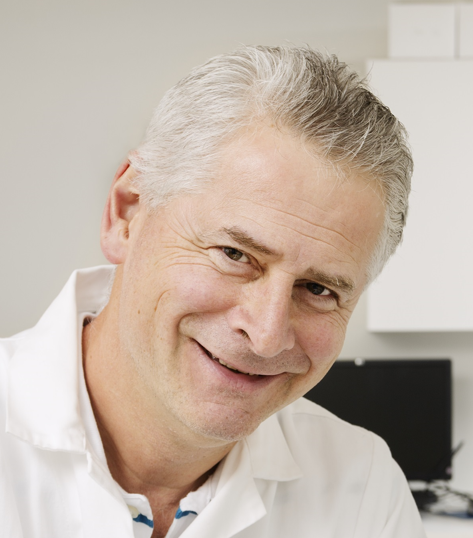
- Born: 13 August 1961 (age 65); Podbořany, Czechoslovakia
- Citizenship: Swedish
- Education: Ph.D. in chemistry from Chalmers University of Technology; Göteborg University, B.Sc in Chemistry
- Known for: quantitative real-time PCR (qPCR); TATAA Biocenter
- Scientific career
- Fields: Biochemistry
- Workplaces: Biotechnology Institute, Czech Academy of Sciences in the Czech Republic; MultiD Analyses AB

Mikael Kubista (born 13 August 1961) is a Czech-born Swedish chemist and entrepreneur who works in the field of molecular diagnostics.

== Education ==
He completed his undergraduate studies at University of Gothenburg, earning a B.Sc. degree in chemistry in 1984. He then pursued a Licentiate in Physical Chemistry at the Institute of Chemistry and Chemical Engineering, Chalmers University of Technology in Göteborg, which he completed in 1986. Kubista obtained his Ph.D. in chemistry from Chalmers University of Technology. Following his doctoral studies, he conducted postdoctoral research at La Trobe University in Melbourne, Australia, and Yale University in New Haven, US. Additionally, he has held visiting professor positions at various universities, including the University of Maryland in College Park, US, in June 2000, and the University of A Coruña in Spain, during September–November 2003 and July 2006 to June 2007.

== Career ==
=== Academic career ===
Kubista began his academic career in 1991 as an assistant professor in the Department of Physical Chemistry at Chalmers University of Technology. From 1993 to 1997, he was an associate professor in the Department of Biochemistry at the same institution. Following this, he held the position of professor in the Department of Biochemistry at Chalmers University of Technology from 1997 to 2006. He has served as head for a laboratory at the Biotechnology Institute, Czech Academy of Sciences since 2007.

=== LightUp Technologies AB ===
In 1998 Kubista founded LightUp Technologies AB after his research finding of LightUp probes, a company that develops real-time PCR tests for human infectious diseases.

=== TATAA Biocenter ===
In 2001, Kubista cofounded TATAA Biocenter, and Care Equity invested in TATAA Biocenter. To facilitate the investment, a new holding company, Bioholdings LP, was established to acquire TATAA. During restructuring connected to TATAA’s COVID-19 testing business, Kubista and his co-founders, advised by a law firm, carried out an upstream merger between two holding entities. This violated a clause in the agreement that prohibited share transfers without written consent. In June 2023, Kubista was dismissed as CEO and forfeited the founders' shares without compensation. Care Equity sued Kubista. As of October 2025, legal proceedings related to the merger dispute remain ongoing in the Swedish courts. Kubista also sued the law firm for negligent advice and damages.

=== Precision BioAnalytics ===
In 2025 Kubista together with Jens Björkman, Robert Sjöback and Fredrik Adlercreutz founded Precision BioAnalytics, around a new preanalytical procedure that increases sensitivity and improves precision of the preanalytical process in molecular analysis.

=== Selected findings and publications ===
Kubista has close to 300 publications.

- Studied and identified chromophores and a variety of dyes commonly used as biomolecule labels like: tryptophan, DAPI, fluorescein, thiazole orange, and BEBO.
- Designed a probe that exhibit luminescence upon binding to specific nucleic acids.
- Techniques for gene expression at the level of individual cells and subcellular compartments.
- Discovered the Regeneration Initiating Cells (RICs)
