= RNase H-dependent PCR =

Laboratory technique

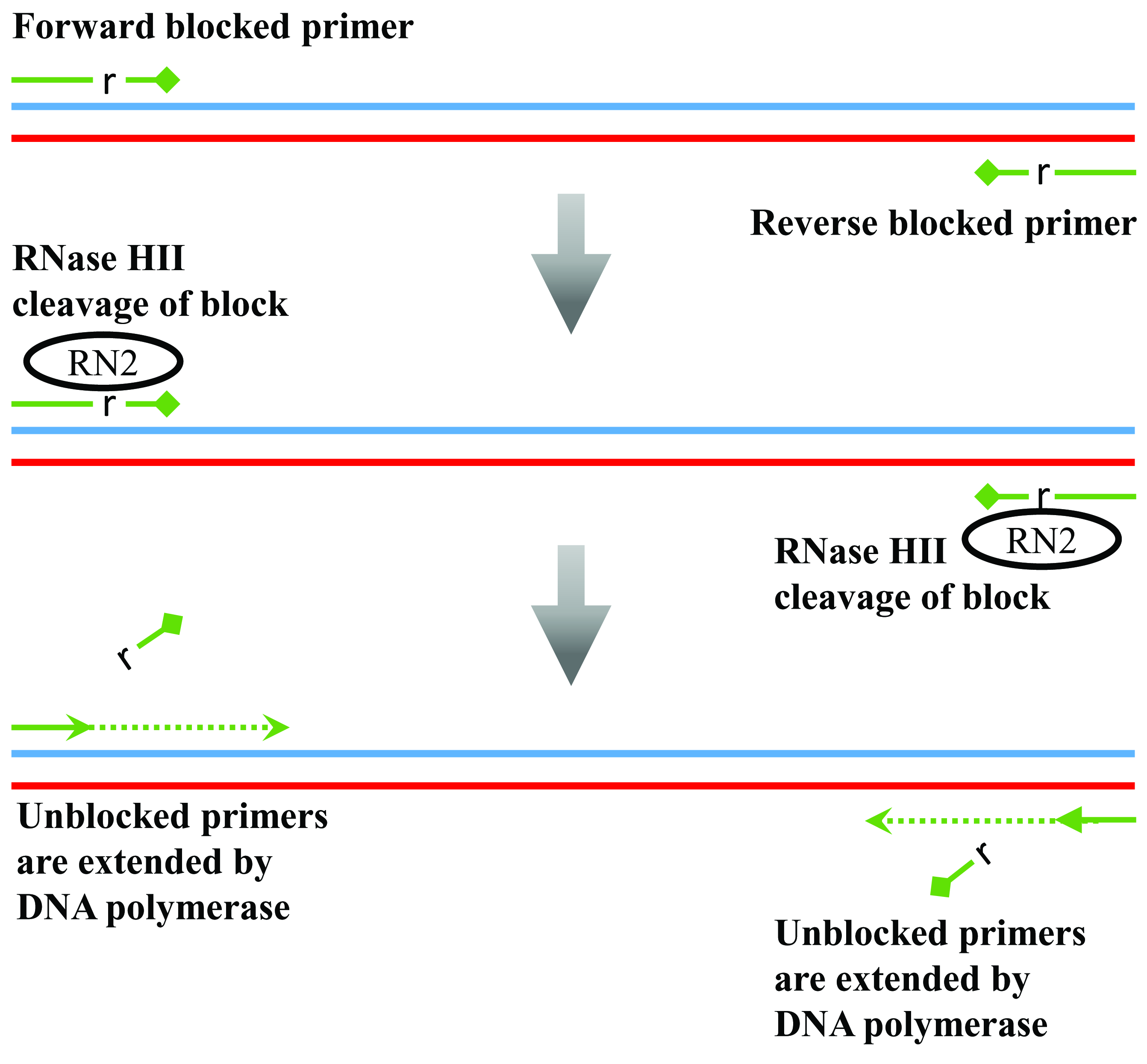
Figure 1: rhPCR mechanism.

RNase H-dependent PCR (rhPCR) is a modification of the standard PCR technique. In rhPCR, the primers are designed with a removable amplification block on the 3’ end. Amplification of the blocked primer is dependent on the cleavage activity of a hyperthermophilic archaeal Type II RNase H enzyme during hybridization to the complementary target sequence. This RNase H enzyme possesses several useful characteristics that enhance the PCR. First, it has very little enzymatic activity at low temperature, enabling a “hot start PCR” without modifications to the DNA polymerase. Second, the cleavage efficiency of the enzyme is reduced in the presence of mismatches near the RNA residue. This allows for reduced primer dimer formation, detection of alternative splicing variants, ability to perform multiplex PCR with higher numbers of PCR primers, and the ability to detect single-nucleotide polymorphisms.

== Principle ==
rhPCR primers consist of three sections. 1) The 5’ DNA section, equivalent in length and melting temperature (Tm) requirements to a standard PCR primer, is extended after cleavage by the RNase HII enzyme. 2) A single RNA base provides the cleavage site for the RNase HII. 3) A short 3’ extension of four or five bases followed by a blocker (usually a short, non-extendable molecule like a propanediol) prevents extension by a DNA polymerase until removal. A rhPCR reaction begins with the primers and template free in solution (Figure 1). While free in solution, these primers are not deblocked by the RNase HII enzyme, as they must be in an RNA:DNA heteroduplex with the template to be cleaved. Once bound to the template, the rhPCR primers are cleaved by the thermostable RNase HII enzyme. This removes the block, allowing for the DNA polymerase to extend off of the primers. The cycling of the PCR reaction continues the process. rhPCR primers are designed so that after cleavage by the RNase H2 enzyme, the Tm of the primers are still greater than the annealing temperature of PCR reaction. These primers can be used in both 5’ nuclease Taqman and SYBR Green types of quantitative PCR.

== Applications ==
rhPCR can be used for quantitative PCR and medical or environmental laboratories:

- Gene expression assays
- Alternative splicing
- SNP genotyping
- Multiplex PCR

== See also ==
- Quantitative PCR
- Taqman
- SYBR Green
- Reverse transcription polymerase chain reaction
- Molecular beacon
- Gene Expression
