= Helicase-dependent amplification =

Helicase-dependent amplification (HDA) is a method for in vitro DNA amplification (like the polymerase chain reaction) that takes place at a constant temperature.

== Introduction ==
The polymerase chain reaction is the most widely used method for in vitro DNA amplification for purposes of molecular biology and biomedical research. This process involves the separation of the double-stranded DNA in high heat into single strands (the denaturation step, typically achieved at 95–97 °C), annealing of the primers to the single stranded DNA (the annealing step) and copying the single strands to create new double-stranded DNA (the extension step that requires the DNA polymerase) requires the reaction to be done in a thermal cycler. These bench-top machines are large, expensive and costly to run and maintain, limiting the potential applications of DNA amplification in situations outside the laboratory (e.g., in the identification of potentially hazardous micro-organisms at the scene of investigation, or at the point of care of a patient). Although PCR is usually associated with thermal cycling, the original patent by Mullis et al. disclosed the use of a helicase as a means for denaturation of double stranded DNA thereby including isothermal nucleic acid amplification. In vivo, DNA is replicated by DNA polymerases with various accessory proteins, including a DNA helicase that acts to separate the DNA by unwinding the DNA double helix. HDA was developed from this concept, using a helicase (an enzyme) to denature the DNA.

== Methodology ==
Strands of double-stranded DNA are first separated by a DNA helicase and coated by single-stranded DNA (ssDNA)-binding proteins. In the second step, two sequence-specific primers hybridise to each border of the DNA template. DNA polymerases are then used to extend the primers annealed to the templates to produce a double-stranded DNA and the two newly synthesized DNA products are then used as substrates by DNA helicases, entering the next round of the reaction. Thus, a simultaneous chain reaction develops, resulting in exponential amplification of the selected target sequence (see Vincent et al.., 2004 for a schematic diagram).

== Present progress and the advantages and disadvantages of HDA ==
Since the publication of its discovery, HDA technology has been used for a "simple, easy to adapt nucleic acid test for the detection of Clostridioides difficile". Other applications include the rapid detection of Staphylococcus aureus by the amplification and detection of a short DNA sequence specific to the bacterium. The advantages of HDA is that it provides a rapid method of nucleic acid amplification of a specific target at an isothermic temperature that does not require a thermal cycler. However, the optimisation of primers and sometimes buffers is required beforehand by the researcher. Normally primer and buffer optimisation is tested and achieved through PCR, raising the question of the need to spend extra on a separate system to do the actual amplification. Despite the selling point that HDA negates the use of a thermal cycler and therefore allows research to be conducted in the field, much of the work required to detect potentially hazardous microorganisms is carried out in a research/hospital lab setting regardless. At present, mass diagnoses from a great number of samples cannot yet be achieved by HDA, whereas PCR reactions carried out in thermal cycler that can hold multi-well sample plates allows for the amplification and detection of the intended DNA target from a maximum of 96 samples. The cost of purchasing reagents for HDA are also relatively expensive to that of PCR reagents, more so since it comes as a ready-made kit.
