= Primer dimer =

Byproduct in PCR formed by primer annealing to itself

A primer dimer (PD) is a potential by-product in the polymerase chain reaction (PCR), a common biotechnological method. As its name implies, a PD consists of two primer molecules that have attached (hybridized) to each other because of strings of complementary bases in the primers. As a result, the DNA polymerase amplifies the PD, leading to competition for PCR reagents, thus potentially inhibiting amplification of the DNA sequence targeted for PCR amplification. In quantitative PCR, PDs may interfere with accurate quantification.

== Mechanism of formation ==
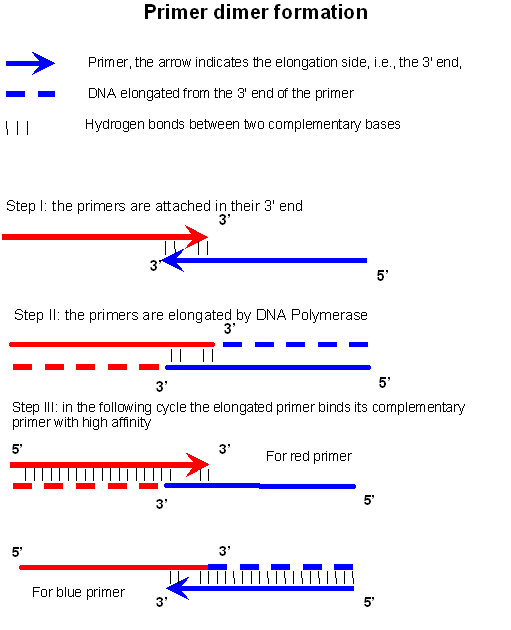
Primer dimer is formed and amplified in a three-step process

A primer dimer is formed and amplified in three steps. In the first step, two primers anneal at their respective 3' ends (step I in the figure). If this construct is stable enough, the DNA polymerase will bind and extend the primers according to the complementary sequence (step II in the figure). An important factor contributing to the stability of the construct in step I is a high GC-content at the 3' ends and length of the overlap. The third step occurs in the next cycle, when a single strand of the product of step II is used as a template to which fresh primers anneal leading to synthesis of more PD product.

== Detection ==
Primer dimers may be visible after gel electrophoresis of the PCR product. PDs in ethidium bromide-stained gels are typically seen as a 30-50 base-pair (bp) band or smear of moderate to high intensity and distinguishable from the band of the target sequence, which is typically longer than 50 bp.

In quantitative PCR, PDs may be detected by melting curve analysis with intercalating dyes, such as SYBR Green I, a nonspecific dye for detection of double-stranded DNA. Because they usually consist of short sequences, the PDs denature at a lower temperature than the target sequence and hence can be distinguished by their melting-curve characteristics.

== Preventing primer-dimer formation ==
One approach to prevent PDs consists of physical-chemical optimization of the PCR system, i.e. changing the concentrations of primers, magnesium chloride, nucleotides, ionic strength and temperature of the reaction. This method is somewhat limited by the physical-chemical characteristics that also determine the efficiency of amplification of the target sequence in the PCR. Therefore, reducing PDs formation may also result in reduced PCR efficiency. To overcome this limitation, other methods aim to reduce the formation of PDs only, including primer design, and use of different PCR enzyme systems or reagents.

=== Primer-design software ===
Primer-design software uses algorithms that check for the potential of DNA secondary structure formation and annealing of primers to itself or within primer pairs. Physical parameters that are taken into account by the software are potential self-complementarity and GC content of the primers; similar melting temperatures of the primers; and absence of secondary structures, such as stem-loops, in the DNA target sequence.

=== Hot-start PCR ===
Because primers are designed to have low complementarity to each other, they may anneal (step I in the figure) only at low temperature, e.g. room temperature, such as during the preparation of the reaction mixture. Although DNA polymerases used in PCR are most active around 70 °C, they have some polymerizing activity also at lower temperatures, which can cause DNA synthesis from primers after annealing to each other. Several methods have been developed to prevent PDs formation until the reaction reaches the working temperature of 60-70 °C, and these include initial inhibition of the DNA polymerase, or physical separation of reaction components reaction until the reaction mixture reaches the higher temperatures. These methods are referred to as hot-start PCR.

Wax: in this method the enzyme is spatially separated from the reaction mixture by wax that melts when the reaction reaches high temperature.

Slow release of magnesium: DNA polymerase requires magnesium ions for activity, so the magnesium is chemically separated from the reaction by binding to a chemical compound, and is released into the solution only at high temperature

Non-covalent binding of inhibitor: in this method a peptide, antibody or aptamer are non-covalently bound to the enzyme at low temperature and inhibit its activity. After an incubation of 1–5 minutes at 95 °C, the inhibitor is released and the reaction starts.

Cold-sensitive Taq polymerase: is a modified DNA polymerase with almost no activity at low temperature.

Chemical modification: in this method a small molecule is covalently bound to the side chain of an amino acid in the active site of the DNA polymerase. The small molecule is released from the enzyme by incubation of the reaction mixture for 10–15 minutes at 95 °C. Once the small molecule is released, the enzyme is activated.

=== Structural modifications of primers ===
Another approach to prevent or reduce PD formation is by modifying the primers so that annealing with themselves or each other does not cause extension.

HANDS (Homo-Tag Assisted Non-Dimer System): a nucleotide tail, complementary to the 3' end of the primer is added to the 5' end of the primer. Because of the close proximity of the 5' tail it anneals to the 3' end of the primer. The result is a stem-loop primer that excludes annealing involving shorter overlaps, but permits annealing of the primer to its fully complementary sequence in the target.

Chimeric primers: some DNA bases in the primer are replaced with RNA bases, creating a chimeric sequence. The melting temperature of a chimeric sequence with another chimeric sequence is lower than that of chimeric sequence with DNA. This difference enables setting the annealing temperature such that the primer will anneal to its target sequence, but not to other chimeric primers.

Blocked-cleavable primers: a method known as RNase H-dependent PCR (rhPCR), utilizes a thermostable RNase HII to remove a blocking group from the PCR primers at high temperature. This RNase HII enzyme displays almost no activity at low temperature, making the removal of the block only occur at high temperature. The enzyme also possess inherent primer:template mismatch discrimination, resulting in additional selection against primer-dimers.

Self-Avoiding molecular recognition systems :also known as SAMRS, eliminating primer dimers by introducing nucleotide analogues T*, A*, G* and C* into the primer. The SAMRS DNA could bind to natural DNA, but not to other members of the same SAMRS species. For example, T* could bind to A but not A*, and A* could bind to T but not T*. Thus, through careful design, primers build from SAMRS could avoid primer-primer interactions and allowing sensitive SNP detection as well as multiplex PCR.

=== Preventing signal acquisition from primer dimers ===
While the methods above are designed to reduce PD formation, another approach aims to minimize signal generated from PDs in quantitative PCR. This approach is useful as long as there are few PDs formed and their inhibitory effect on product accumulation is minor.

Four steps PCR: used when working with nonspecific dyes, such as SYBR Green I. It is based on the different length, and hence, different melting temperature of the PDs and the target sequence. In this method the signal is acquired below the melting temperature of the target sequence, but above the melting temperature of the PDs.

Sequence-specific probes: TaqMan and molecular beacon probes generate signal only in the presence of their target (complementary) sequence, and this enhanced specificity precludes signal acquisition (but not possible inhibitory effects on product accumulation) from PDs.
