= Selector technique =

The selector technique is a method to amplify and multiplex genomic DNA.

== Process ==
Genomic DNA is digested with restriction enzymes, circularized by hybridisation to selectors and subsequently attached to a vector sequence by ligation. The procedure results in circular DNA molecules with an included general primer pair motif that can be used for amplification by PCR or RCA.

== Selector construct ==
A selector consists of two oligonucleotides, one Vector oligonucleotide and one Selector probe. Together they form one Selector with target specific ends on each side of a general primer motif.

== Selection mechanisms ==
1. A selector probe hybridizes with both ends of the selected target.
2. A selector probe hybridizes with one end to the 3’ end of the target and the other end to an internal sequence of the target. The protruding 5' end is cleaved off using Taq polymerase.

== Publications ==
- Demonstration of the selector method
- The PieceMaker software for designing selector experiments
