= Polymerase chain reaction =

Laboratory technique to multiply a DNA sample for study

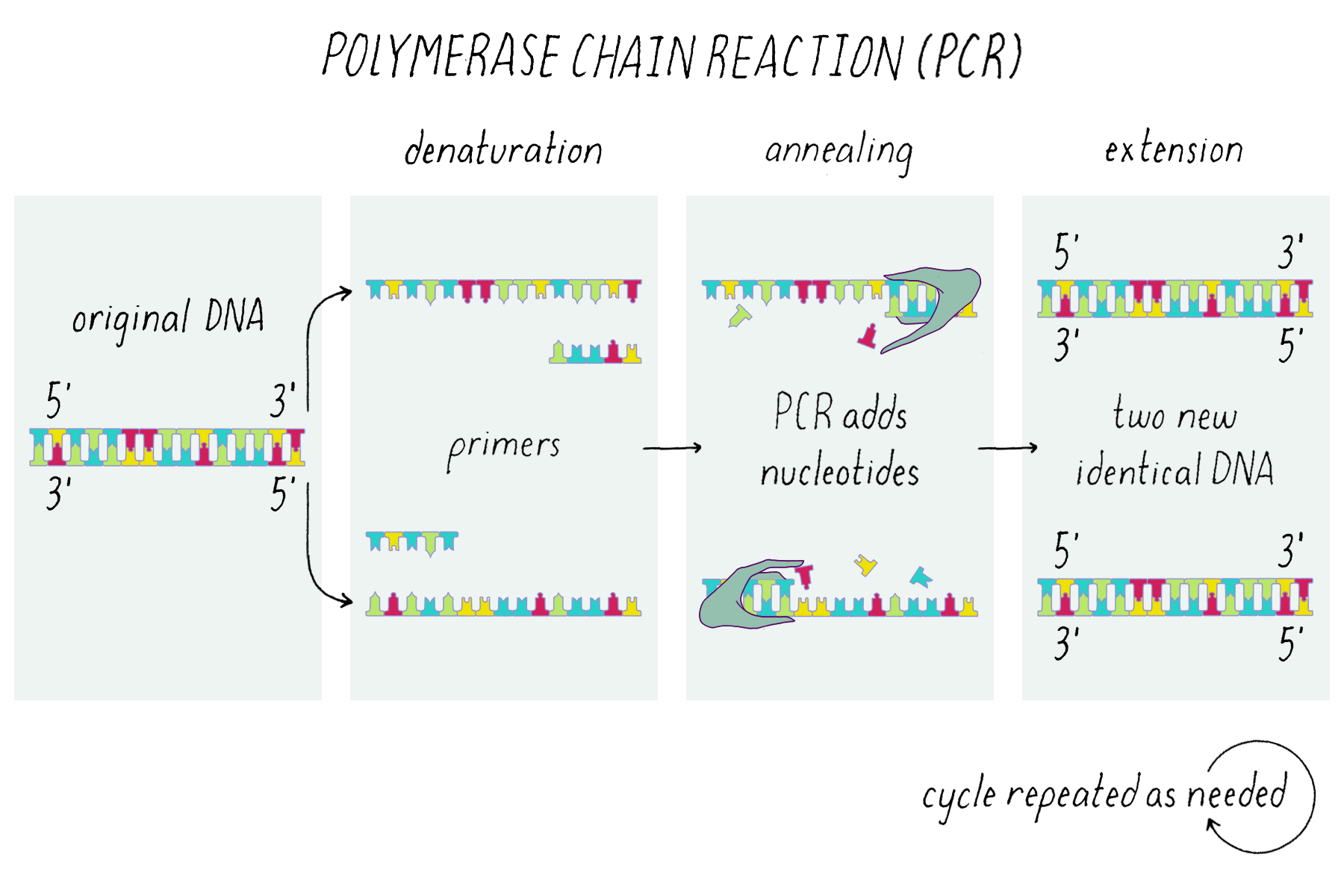
Polymerase chain reaction is a laboratory technique used to make multiple copies of a piece of DNA.

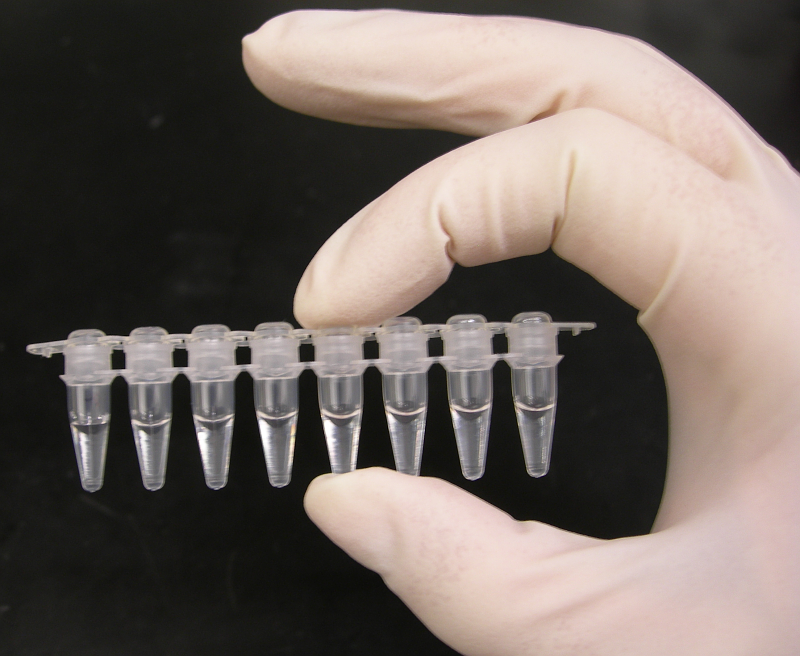
A strip of eight PCR tubes, each containing a 100 μL reaction mixture

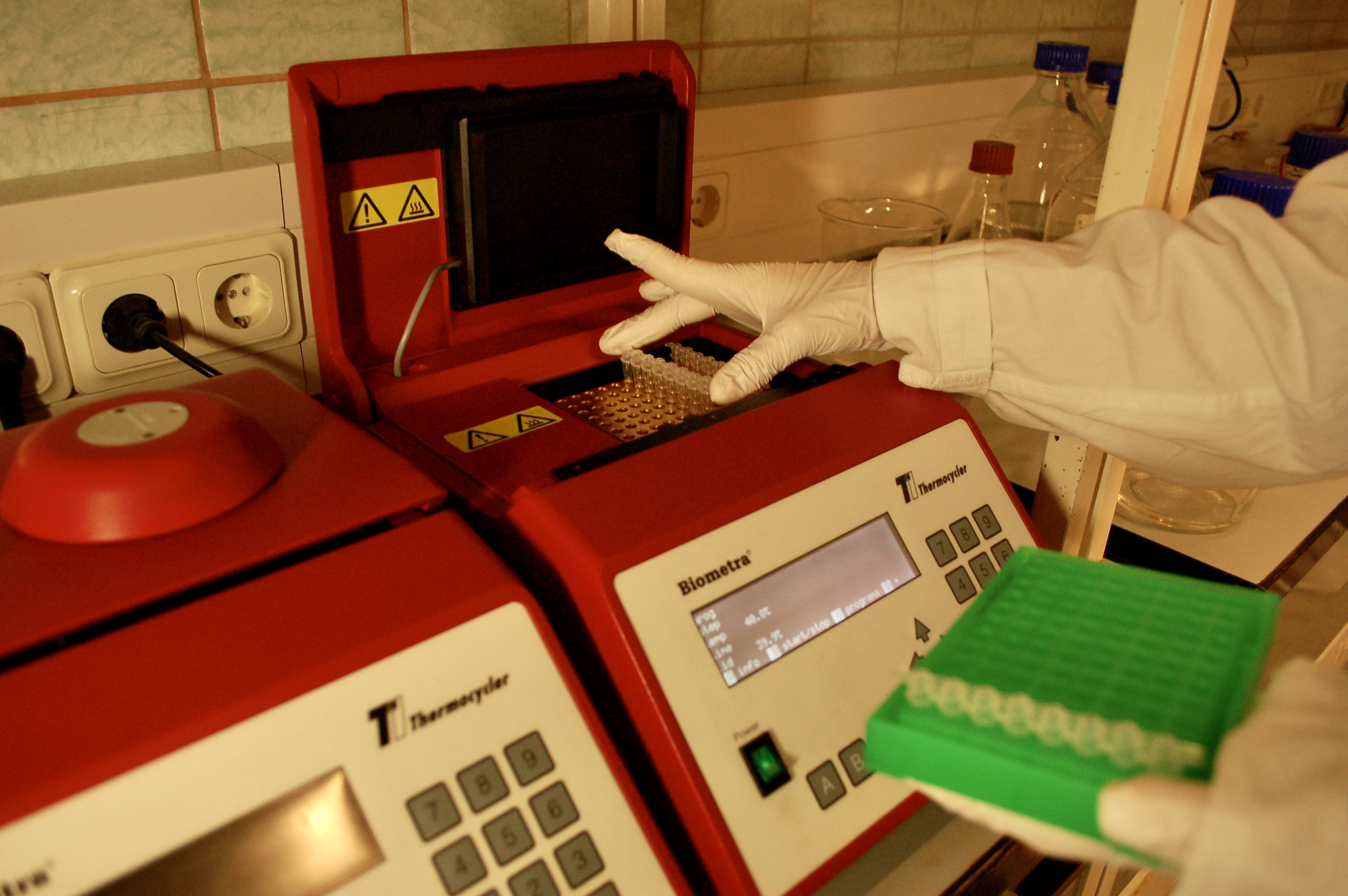
Placing a strip of eight PCR tubes into a thermal cycler

The polymerase chain reaction (PCR) is a laboratory method widely used to amplify copies of specific DNA sequences rapidly, to enable detailed study. PCR was invented in 1983 by American biochemist Kary Mullis at Cetus Corporation. Mullis and biochemist Michael Smith, who had developed other essential ways of manipulating DNA, were jointly awarded the Nobel Prize in Chemistry in 1993.

PCR is fundamental to many of the procedures used in genetic testing, research, including analysis of ancient samples of DNA, and identification of infectious agents. Using PCR, copies of very small amounts of DNA sequences are exponentially amplified in a series of cycles of temperature changes. PCR is now a common and often indispensable technique used in medical laboratory research for a broad variety of applications including biomedical research and forensic science.

The majority of PCR methods rely on thermal cycling. Thermal cycling exposes reagents to repeated cycles of heating and cooling to permit different temperature-dependent reactions—specifically, DNA melting and enzyme-driven DNA replication. PCR employs two main reagents—primers (which are short single strand DNA fragments known as oligonucleotides that are a complementary sequence to the target DNA region) and a thermostable DNA polymerase. In the first step of PCR, the two strands of the DNA double helix are physically separated at a high temperature in a process called nucleic acid denaturation. In the second step, the temperature is lowered and the primers bind to the complementary sequences of DNA. The two DNA strands then become templates for DNA polymerase to enzymatically assemble a new DNA strand from free nucleotides, the building blocks of DNA. As PCR progresses, the DNA generated is itself used as a template for replication, setting in motion a chain reaction in which the original DNA template is exponentially amplified.

Almost all PCR applications employ a heat-stable DNA polymerase, such as Taq polymerase, an enzyme originally isolated from the thermophilic bacterium Thermus aquaticus discovered by the glycobiologist Hudson H. Freeze and microbiologist Thomas D. Brock in 1969. If the polymerase used was heat-susceptible, it would denature under the high temperatures of the denaturation step. Before the use of Taq polymerase, DNA polymerase had to be manually added every cycle, which was a tedious and costly process.

Applications of the technique include DNA cloning for sequencing, gene cloning and manipulation, gene mutagenesis; construction of DNA-based phylogenies, or functional analysis of genes; diagnosis and monitoring of genetic disorders; amplification of ancient DNA; analysis of genetic fingerprints for DNA profiling (for example, in forensic science and parentage testing); and detection of pathogens in nucleic acid tests for the diagnosis of infectious diseases.

== Principles ==
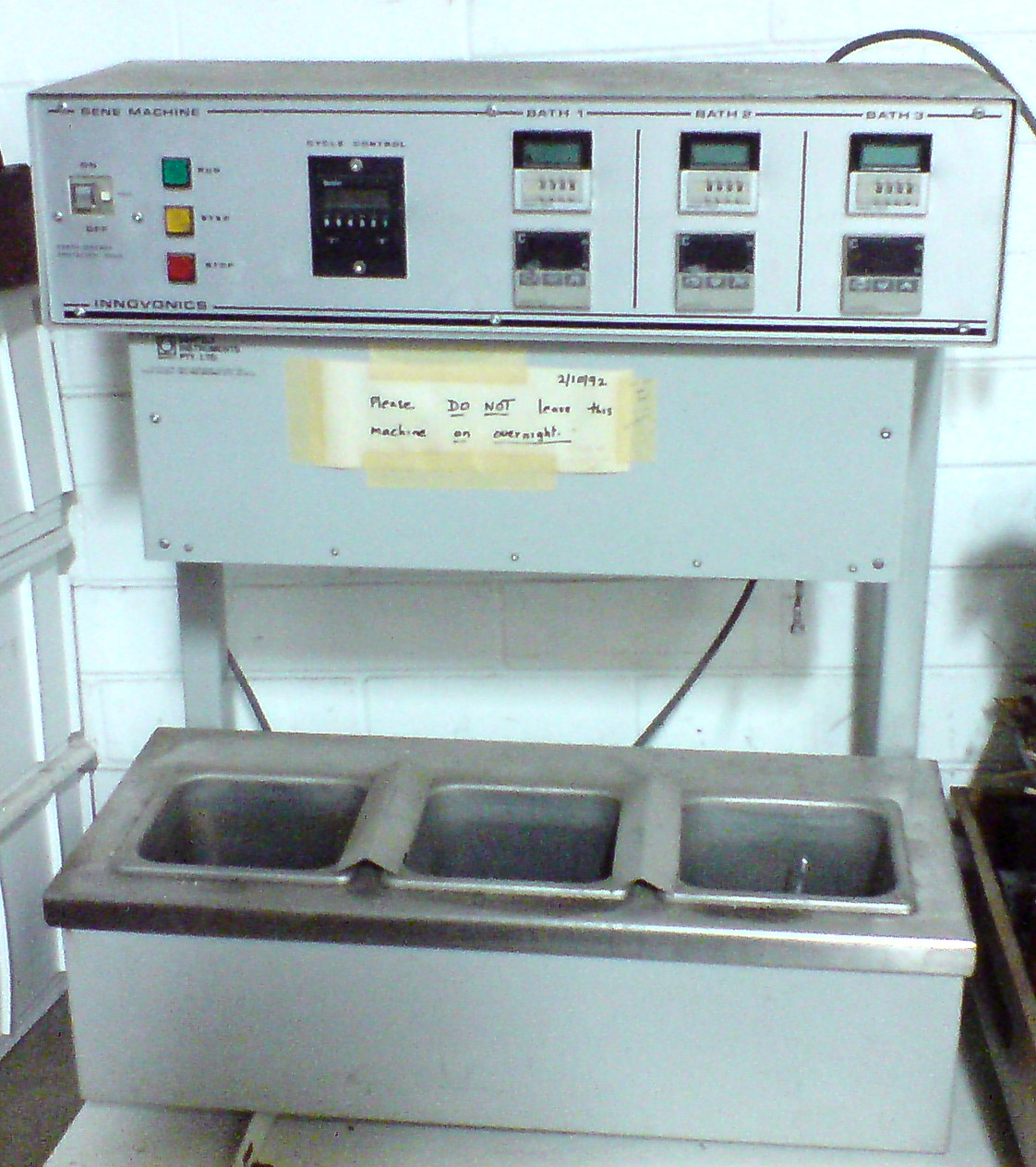
An older, three-temperature thermal cycler for PCR

PCR amplifies a specific region of a DNA strand (the DNA target). Most PCR methods amplify DNA fragments of between 0.1 and 10 kilo-base pairs (kbp) in length, although some techniques allow for amplification of fragments up to 40 kbp. The amount of amplified product is determined by the available substrates in the reaction, which becomes limiting as the reaction progresses.

A basic PCR set-up requires several components and reagents, including:

- a DNA template that contains the DNA target region to amplify
- a DNA polymerase; an enzyme that polymerizes new DNA strands; heat-resistant Taq polymerase is especially common, as it is more likely to remain intact during the high-temperature DNA denaturation process. Pfu polymerase is a heat-resistant polymerase with higher accuracy compared to Taq due to its ability to proofread, but it runs slower. Adding a small amount of Pfu to Taq combines the benefits of both.
- two DNA primers that are complementary to the 3' (three prime) ends of each of the sense and anti-sense strands of the DNA target (DNA polymerase can only bind to and elongate from a double-stranded region of DNA; without primers, there is no double-stranded initiation site at which the polymerase can bind); specific primers that are complementary to the DNA target region are selected beforehand, and are often custom-made in a laboratory or purchased from commercial biochemical suppliers
- deoxynucleoside triphosphates, or dNTPs, the building blocks from which the DNA polymerase synthesizes a new DNA strand
- a buffer solution providing a suitable chemical environment for optimum activity and stability of the DNA polymerase
- bivalent cations, typically magnesium (Mg) or manganese (Mn) ions; Mg^{2+} is the most common, but Mn^{2+} can be used for PCR-mediated DNA mutagenesis, as a higher Mn^{2+} concentration increases the error rate during DNA synthesis; and monovalent cations, typically potassium (K) ions

The reaction is commonly carried out in a volume of 10–200 μL in small reaction tubes (0.2–0.5 mL volumes) in a thermal cycler. The thermal cycler heats and cools the reaction tubes to achieve the temperatures required at each step of the reaction (see below). Many modern thermal cyclers make use of a Peltier device, which permits both heating and cooling of the block holding the PCR tubes simply by reversing the device's electric current. Thin-walled reaction tubes permit favorable thermal conductivity to allow for rapid thermal equilibrium. Most thermal cyclers have heated lids to prevent condensation at the top of the reaction tube. Older thermal cyclers lacking a heated lid require a layer of oil on top of the reaction mixture or a ball of wax inside the tube.

=== Procedure ===
Typically, PCR consists of a series of 20–40 repeated temperature changes, called thermal cycles, with each cycle commonly consisting of two or three discrete temperature steps (see figure below). The cycling is often preceded by a single temperature step at a very high temperature (>90 °C (194 °F)), and followed by one hold at the end for final product extension or brief storage. The temperatures used and the length of time they are applied in each cycle depend on a variety of parameters, including the enzyme used for DNA synthesis, the concentration of bivalent ions and dNTPs in the reaction, and the melting temperature (T_{m}) of the primers. The individual steps common to most PCR methods are: initialization, annealing and extension.

- Initialization: This step is only required for DNA polymerases that require heat activation by hot-start PCR. It consists of heating the reaction chamber to a temperature of 94–96 °C (201–205 °F), or 98 °C (208 °F) if extremely thermostable polymerases are used, which is then held for 1–10 minutes.
- Denaturation: This step is the first regular cycling event and consists of heating the reaction chamber to 94–98 °C (201–208 °F) for 20–30 seconds. This causes DNA melting, or denaturation, of the double-stranded DNA template by breaking the hydrogen bonds between complementary bases, yielding two single-stranded DNA molecules.
- Annealing: In the next step, the reaction temperature is lowered to 50–65 °C (122–149 °F) for 20–40 seconds, allowing annealing of the primers to each of the single-stranded DNA templates. Two different primers are typically included in the reaction mixture: one for each of the two single-stranded complements containing the target region. The primers are single-stranded sequences themselves, but are much shorter than the length of the target region, complementing only very short sequences at the 3' end of each strand.

It is critical to determine a proper temperature for the annealing step because efficiency and specificity are strongly affected by the annealing temperature. This temperature must be low enough to allow for hybridization of the primer to the strand, but high enough for the hybridization to be specific, i.e., the primer should bind only to a perfectly complementary part of the strand, and nowhere else. If the temperature is too low, the primer may bind imperfectly. If it is too high, the primer may not bind at all. A typical annealing temperature is about 3–5 °C below the T_{m} of the primers used. Stable hydrogen bonds between complementary bases are formed only when the primer sequence very closely matches the template sequence. During this step, the polymerase binds to the primer-template hybrid and begins DNA formation.

- Extension/Elongation: The temperature at this step depends on the DNA polymerase used; the optimum activity temperature for the thermostable DNA polymerase of Taq polymerase is approximately 75–80 °C (167–176 °F), though a temperature of 72 °C (162 °F) is commonly used with this enzyme. In this step, the DNA polymerase synthesizes a new DNA strand complementary to the DNA template strand by adding free dNTPs from the reaction mixture that is complementary to the template in the 5'-to-3' direction, condensing the 5'-phosphate group of the dNTPs with the 3'-hydroxy group at the end of the nascent (elongating) DNA strand. The precise time required for elongation depends both on the DNA polymerase used and on the length of the DNA target region to amplify. As a rule of thumb, at their optimal temperature, most DNA polymerases polymerize a thousand bases per minute. Under optimal conditions (i.e., if there are no limitations due to limiting substrates or reagents), at each extension/elongation step, the number of DNA target sequences is doubled. With each successive cycle, the original template strands plus all newly generated strands become template strands for the next round of elongation, leading to exponential (geometric) amplification of the specific DNA target region.

The processes of denaturation, annealing and elongation constitute a single cycle. Multiple cycles are required to amplify the DNA target to millions of copies. The formula used to calculate the number of DNA copies formed after a given number of cycles is 2^{n}, where n is the number of cycles. Thus, a reaction set for 30 cycles results in 2^{30}, or 1,073,741,824 copies of the original double-stranded DNA target region.

- Final elongation: This single step is optional, but is performed at a temperature of 70–74 °C (158–165 °F) (the temperature range required for optimal activity of most polymerases used in PCR) for 5–15 minutes after the last PCR cycle to ensure that any remaining single-stranded DNA is fully elongated.
- Final hold: The final step cools the reaction chamber to 4–15 °C (39–59 °F) for an indefinite time, and may be employed for short-term storage of the PCR products.

Schematic drawing of a complete PCR cycle

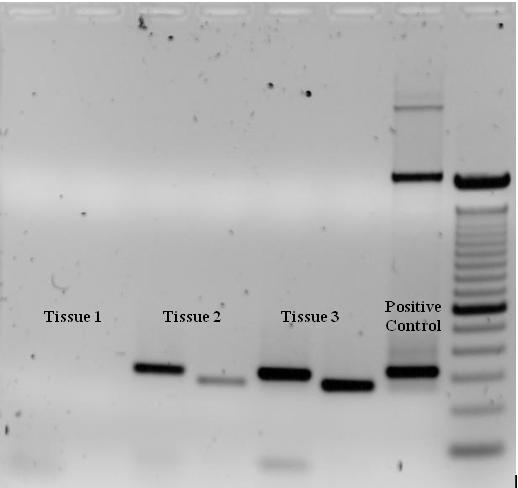
Ethidium bromide-stained PCR products after gel electrophoresis. Two sets of primers were used to amplify a target sequence from three different tissue samples. No amplification is present in sample #1; DNA bands in sample #2 and #3 indicate successful amplification of the target sequence. The gel also shows a positive control, and a DNA ladder containing DNA fragments of defined length for sizing the bands in the experimental PCRs.

To check whether the PCR successfully generated the anticipated DNA target region (also sometimes referred to as the amplimer or amplicon), agarose gel electrophoresis may be employed for size separation of the PCR products. The size of the PCR products is determined by comparison with a DNA ladder, a molecular weight marker which contains DNA fragments of known sizes, which runs on the gel alongside the PCR products.

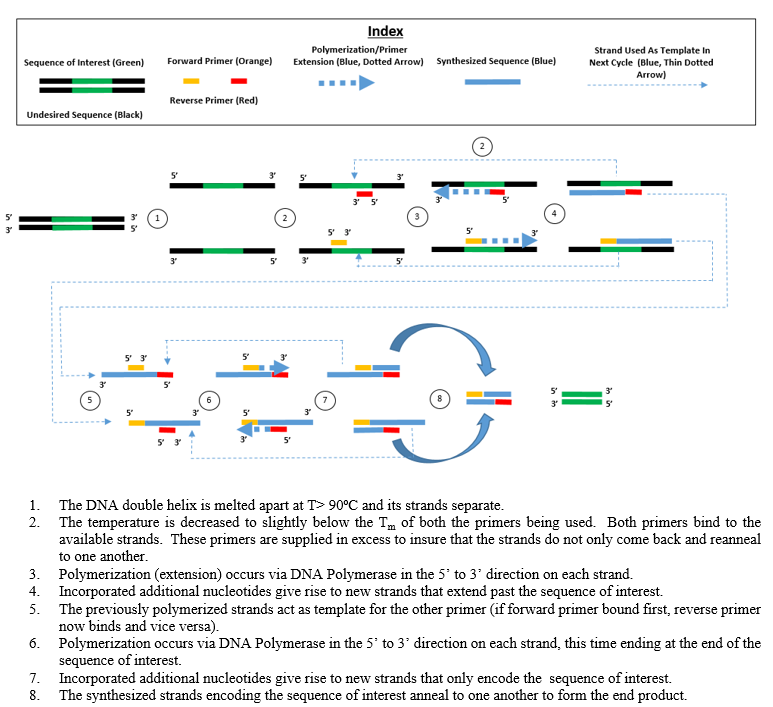
Tucker PCR

=== Stages ===
Exponential amplification

As with other chemical reactions, the reaction rate and efficiency of PCR are affected by limiting factors. Thus, the entire PCR process can further be divided into three stages based on reaction progress:

- Exponential amplification: At every cycle, the amount of product is doubled (assuming 100% reaction efficiency). After 30 cycles, a single copy of DNA can be increased up to 1,000,000,000 (one billion) copies. In a sense, then, the replication of a discrete strand of DNA is being manipulated in a tube under controlled conditions. The reaction is very sensitive: only minute quantities of DNA must be present.
- Leveling off stage: The reaction slows as the DNA polymerase loses activity and as consumption of reagents, such as dNTPs and primers, causes them to become more limited.
- Plateau: No more product accumulates due to exhaustion of reagents and enzyme.

== Optimization ==
In practice, PCR can fail for various reasons, such as sensitivity or contamination. Contamination with extraneous DNA can lead to spurious products and is addressed with lab protocols and procedures that separate pre-PCR mixtures from potential DNA contaminants. For instance, if DNA from a crime scene is analyzed, a single DNA molecule from lab personnel could be amplified and misguide the investigation. Hence the PCR-setup areas is separated from the analysis or purification of other PCR products, disposable plasticware used, and the work surface between reaction setups needs to be thoroughly cleaned.

Specificity can be adjusted by experimental conditions so that no spurious products are generated. Primer-design techniques are important in improving PCR product yield and in avoiding the formation of unspecific products. The usage of alternate buffer components (such as DMSO to help denature DNA) or polymerase enzymes can help with amplification of long or otherwise problematic regions of DNA. For instance, Q5 polymerase is said to be ≈280 times less error-prone than Taq polymerase, and more processive. Both the running parameters (e.g. temperature and duration of cycles), or the addition of reagents, such as formamide, may increase the specificity and yield of PCR. Computer simulations of theoretical PCR results (Electronic PCR) may be performed to assist in primer design.

== Applications ==
=== Selective DNA isolation ===
PCR allows isolation of DNA fragments from genomic DNA by selective amplification of a specific region of DNA. This use of PCR augments, such as generating hybridization probes for Southern or northern hybridization and DNA cloning, which require larger amounts of DNA, representing a specific DNA region. PCR supplies these techniques with high amounts of pure DNA, enabling analysis of DNA samples even from very small amounts of starting material.

Other applications of PCR include DNA sequencing to determine unknown PCR-amplified sequences in which one of the amplification primers may be used in Sanger sequencing, isolation of a DNA sequence to expedite recombinant DNA technologies involving the insertion of a DNA sequence into a plasmid, phage, or cosmid (depending on size) or the genetic material of another organism. Bacterial colonies (such as E. coli) can be rapidly screened by PCR for correct DNA vector constructs. PCR may also be used for genetic fingerprinting; a forensic technique used to identify a person or organism by comparing experimental DNAs through different PCR-based methods.

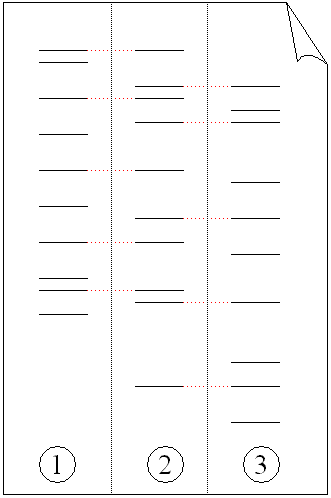
Electrophoresis of PCR-amplified DNA fragments: 1. Father; 2. Child; 3. Mother; The child has inherited some, but not all, of the fingerprints of each of its parents, giving it a new, unique fingerprint.

Some PCR fingerprint methods have high discriminative power and can be used to identify genetic relationships between individuals, such as parent-child or between siblings, and are used in paternity testing (Fig. 4). This technique may also be used to determine evolutionary relationships among organisms when certain molecular clocks are used (i.e. the 16S rRNA and recA genes of microorganisms).

=== Amplification and quantification of DNA ===
Because PCR amplifies the regions of DNA that it targets, PCR can be used to analyze extremely small amounts of sample. This is often critical for forensic analysis, when only a trace amount of DNA is available as evidence. PCR may also be used in the analysis of ancient DNA that is tens of thousands of years old. These PCR-based techniques have been successfully used on animals, such as a forty-thousand-year-old mammoth, and also on human DNA, in applications ranging from the analysis of Egyptian mummies to the identification of a Russian tsar and the body of English king Richard III.

Quantitative PCR or real-time PCR (qPCR not to be confused with RT-PCR) methods allow the estimation of the amount of a given sequence present in a sample—a technique often applied to quantitatively determine levels of gene expression. The MIQE guidelines written by professors Stephen Bustin, Michael Pfaffl, Mikael Kubista and colleagues outline how qPCR experiments shall be performed and the results reported. Quantitative PCR is an established tool for DNA quantification that measures the accumulation of DNA product after each round of PCR amplification.

qPCR allows the quantification and detection of a specific DNA sequence in real time since it measures concentration while the synthesis process is taking place. There are two methods for simultaneous detection and quantification. The first method consists of using fluorescent dyes that are retained nonspecifically in between the double strands. The second method involves probes that code for specific sequences and are fluorescently labeled. Detection of DNA using these methods can only be seen after the hybridization of probes with its complementary DNA (cDNA) takes place. An interesting technique combination is real-time PCR and reverse transcription. This sophisticated technique, called RT-qPCR, allows for the quantification of a small quantity of RNA. Through this combined technique, mRNA is converted to cDNA, which is further quantified using qPCR. This technique lowers the possibility of error at the end point of PCR, increasing chances for detection of genes associated with genetic diseases such as cancer. Laboratories use RT-qPCR for the purpose of sensitively measuring gene regulation. The mathematical foundations for the reliable quantification of the PCR and RT-qPCR facilitate the implementation of accurate fitting procedures of experimental data in research, medical, diagnostic and infectious disease applications.

=== Medical and diagnostic applications ===
Prospective parents can be tested for being genetic carriers, or their children might be tested for actually being affected by a disease. DNA samples for prenatal testing can be obtained by amniocentesis, chorionic villus sampling, or even by the analysis of rare fetal cells circulating in the mother's bloodstream. PCR analysis is also essential to preimplantation genetic diagnosis, where individual cells of a developing embryo are tested for mutations.

- PCR can also be used as part of a sensitive test for tissue typing, vital to organ transplantation. As of 2008, there is even a proposal to replace the traditional antibody-based tests for blood type with PCR-based tests.
- Many forms of cancer involve alterations to oncogenes. By using PCR-based tests to study these mutations, therapy regimens can sometimes be individually customized to a patient. PCR permits early diagnosis of malignant diseases such as leukemia and lymphomas, which is currently the most developed in cancer research and is already being used routinely. PCR assays can be performed directly on genomic DNA samples to detect translocation-specific malignant cells at a sensitivity that is at least 10,000 fold higher than that of other methods. PCR is very useful in the medical field since it allows for the isolation and amplification of tumor suppressors. Quantitative PCR, for example, can be used to quantify and analyze single cells, as well as recognize DNA, mRNA and protein confirmations and combinations.

=== Infectious disease applications ===
PCR allows for rapid and highly specific diagnosis of infectious diseases, including those caused by bacteria or viruses. PCR also permits identification of non-cultivatable or slow-growing microorganisms such as mycobacteria, anaerobic bacteria, or viruses from tissue culture assays and animal models. The basis for PCR diagnostic applications in microbiology is the detection of infectious agents and the discrimination of non-pathogenic from pathogenic strains by virtue of specific genes.

Characterization and detection of infectious disease organisms have been revolutionized by PCR in the following ways:

- The human immunodeficiency virus (or HIV) is a difficult target to find and eradicate. The earliest tests for infection relied on the presence of antibodies to the virus circulating in the bloodstream. However, antibodies don't appear until many weeks after infection, maternal antibodies mask the infection of a newborn, and therapeutic agents to fight the infection don't affect the antibodies. PCR tests have been developed that can detect as little as one viral genome among the DNA of over 50,000 host cells. Infections can be detected earlier, donated blood can be screened directly for the virus, newborns can be immediately tested for infection, and the effects of antiviral treatments can be quantified.
- Some disease organisms, such as those for tuberculosis, are difficult to sample from patients and slow to be grown in the laboratory. PCR-based tests have allowed detection of small numbers of disease organisms (both live and dead) in convenient samples. Detailed genetic analysis can also be used to detect antibiotic resistance, allowing immediate and effective therapy. The effects of therapy can also be immediately evaluated.
- The spread of a disease organism through populations of domestic or wild animals can be monitored by PCR testing. In many cases, the appearance of new virulent subtypes can be detected and monitored. The subtypes of an organism that were responsible for earlier epidemics can also be determined by PCR analysis.
- Viral DNA can be detected by PCR. The primers used must be specific to the targeted sequences in the DNA of a virus, and PCR can be used for diagnostic analyses or DNA sequencing of the viral genome. The high sensitivity of PCR permits virus detection soon after infection and even before the onset of disease. Such early detection may give physicians a significant lead time in treatment. The amount of virus ("viral load") in a patient can also be quantified by PCR-based DNA quantitation techniques (see below). A variant of PCR (RT-PCR) is used for detecting viral RNA rather than DNA: in this test the enzyme reverse transcriptase is used to generate a DNA sequence that matches the viral RNA; this DNA is then amplified as per the usual PCR method. RT-PCR is widely used to detect the SARS-CoV-2 viral genome.
- Diseases such as pertussis (or whooping cough) are caused by the bacteria Bordetella pertussis. This bacteria is marked by a serious acute respiratory infection that affects various animals and humans and has led to the deaths of many young children. The pertussis toxin is a protein exotoxin that binds to cell receptors by two dimers and reacts with different cell types such as T lymphocytes which play a role in cell immunity. PCR is an important testing tool that can detect sequences within the gene for the pertussis toxin. Because PCR has a high sensitivity for the toxin and a rapid turnaround time, it is very efficient for diagnosing pertussis when compared to culture.

=== Forensic applications ===
The development of PCR-based genetic (or DNA) fingerprinting protocols has seen widespread application in forensics:

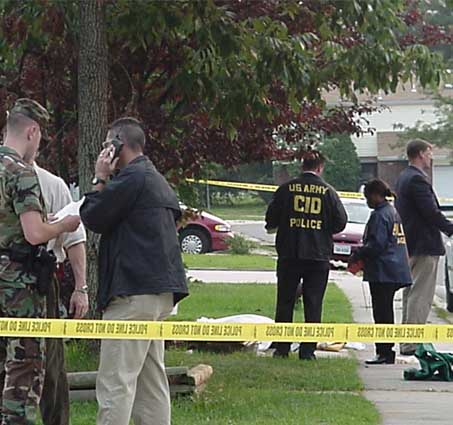
- DNA samples are often taken at crime scenes and analyzed by PCR.
  In its most discriminating form, genetic fingerprinting can uniquely discriminate any one person from the entire population of the world. Minute samples of DNA can be isolated from a crime scene and compared to that from suspects or from a DNA database of earlier evidence or convicts. Simpler versions of these tests are often used to rapidly rule out suspects during a criminal investigation. Evidence from decades-old crimes can be tested, confirming or exonerating the people originally convicted.
- Forensic DNA typing has been an effective way of identifying or exonerating criminal suspects due to analysis of evidence discovered at a crime scene. The human genome has many repetitive regions that can be found within gene sequences or in non-coding regions of the genome. Specifically, up to 40% of human DNA is repetitive. There are two distinct categories for these repetitive, non-coding regions in the genome. The first category is called variable number tandem repeats (VNTR), which are 10–100 base pairs long, and the second category is called short tandem repeats (STR), and these consist of repeated 2–10 base pair sections. PCR is used to amplify several well-known VNTRs and STRs using primers that flank each of the repetitive regions. The sizes of the fragments obtained from any individual for each of the STRs will indicate which alleles are present. By analyzing several STRs for an individual, a set of alleles for each person will be found that statistically is likely to be unique. Researchers have identified the complete sequence of the human genome. This sequence can be easily accessed through the NCBI website and is used in many real-life applications. For example, the FBI has compiled a set of DNA marker sites used for identification, and these are called the Combined DNA Index System (CODIS) DNA database. Using this database enables statistical analysis to be used to determine the probability that a DNA sample will match. PCR is a very powerful and significant analytical tool to use for forensic DNA typing because researchers only need a very small amount of the target DNA to be used for analysis. For example, a single human hair with an attached hair follicle has enough DNA to conduct the analysis. Similarly, a few sperm, skin samples from under the fingernails, or a small amount of blood can provide enough DNA for conclusive analysis.
- Less discriminating forms of DNA fingerprinting can help in DNA paternity testing, where an individual is matched with their close relatives. DNA from unidentified human remains can be tested and compared with that from possible parents, siblings, or children. Similar testing can be used to confirm the biological parents of an adopted (or kidnapped) child. The actual biological father of a newborn can also be confirmed (or ruled out).
- The PCR AMGX/AMGY design has been shown to not only facilitate amplifying DNA sequences from a very minuscule amount of genome. However, it can also be used for real-time sex determination from forensic bone samples. This provides a powerful and effective way to determine gender in forensic cases and ancient specimens.

=== Research applications ===
PCR has been applied to many areas of research in molecular genetics:

- PCR allows rapid production of short pieces of DNA, even when not more than the sequence of the two primers is known. This ability of PCR augments many methods, such as generating hybridization probes for Southern or northern blot hybridization. PCR supplies these techniques with large amounts of pure DNA, sometimes as a single strand, enabling analysis even from very small amounts of starting material.
- The task of DNA sequencing can also be assisted by PCR. Known segments of DNA can easily be produced from a patient with a genetic disease mutation. Modifications to the amplification technique can extract segments from a completely unknown genome, or can generate just a single strand of an area of interest.
- PCR has numerous applications to the more traditional process of DNA cloning. It can extract segments for insertion into a vector from a larger genome, which may be only available in small quantities. Using a single set of 'vector primers,' it can also analyze or extract fragments that have already been inserted into vectors. Some alterations to the PCR protocol can generate mutations (general or site-directed) of an inserted fragment.
- Sequence-tagged sites is a process where PCR is used as an indicator that a particular segment of a genome is present in a particular clone. The Human Genome Project found this application vital to mapping the cosmid clones they were sequencing and to coordinating the results from different laboratories.
- An application of PCR is the phylogenic analysis of DNA from ancient sources, such as that found in the recovered bones of Neanderthals, from frozen tissues of mammoths, or from the brain of Egyptian mummies. In some cases the highly degraded DNA from these sources might be reassembled during the early stages of amplification.
- A common application of PCR is the study of patterns of gene expression. Tissues (or even individual cells) can be analyzed at different stages to see which genes have become active or which have been switched off. This application can also use quantitative PCR to quantify the actual levels of expression
- The ability of PCR to simultaneously amplify several loci from individual sperm has greatly enhanced the more traditional task of genetic mapping by studying chromosomal crossovers after meiosis. Rare crossover events between very close loci have been directly observed by analyzing thousands of individual sperms. Similarly, unusual deletions, insertions, translocations, or inversions can be analyzed, all without having to wait (or pay) for the long and laborious processes of fertilization, embryogenesis, etc.
- Site-directed mutagenesis: PCR can be used to create mutant genes with mutations chosen by scientists at will. These mutations can be chosen in order to understand how proteins accomplish their functions and to change or improve protein function.

== Advantages ==
PCR has a number of advantages. It is fairly simple to understand and to use and produces results rapidly. The technique is highly sensitive with the potential to produce millions to billions of copies of a specific product for sequencing, cloning, and analysis. qRT-PCR shares the same advantages as PCR, with an added advantage of quantification of the synthesized product. Therefore, it has its uses to analyze alterations of gene expression levels in tumors, microbes, or other disease states.

PCR is a powerful research tool used to expand scientific knowledge. The technique can be used to identify the sequences of diseases and viruses, thus providing a better understanding of those previously researched. As the procedure is further simplified and sensitive non-radiometric detection systems developed, PCR will take a dominant place in the clinical laboratory.

== Limitations ==
One major limitation of PCR is that prior information about the target sequence is necessary in order to generate the primers that will allow its selective amplification. This means that, typically, PCR users must know the precise sequence(s) upstream of the target region on each of the two single-stranded templates in order to ensure that the DNA polymerase properly binds to the primer-template hybrids and subsequently generates the entire target region during DNA synthesis. The limitation is offset when using arbitrarily amplified DNA techniques such as DNA amplification fingerprinting (DAF) or randomly amplification of polymorphic DNA (RAPD). These DNA profiling methods use arbitrary primers in PCR reactions that do not require sequence knowledge.

Like all enzymes, DNA polymerases are also prone to error, which in turn causes mutations in the PCR fragments that are generated.

Another limitation of PCR is that even the smallest amount of contaminating DNA can be amplified, resulting in misleading or ambiguous results. To minimize the chance of contamination, investigators should reserve separate rooms for reagent preparation, the PCR, and analysis of product. Reagents should be dispensed into single-use aliquots. Pipettors with disposable plungers and extra-long pipette tips should be routinely used. It is moreover recommended to ensure that the lab set-up follows a unidirectional workflow. No materials or reagents used in the PCR and analysis rooms should ever be taken into the PCR preparation room without thorough decontamination.

Environmental samples that contain humic acids may inhibit PCR amplification and lead to inaccurate results.

== Variations ==
- Allele-specific PCR or The amplification refractory mutation system (ARMS): a diagnostic or cloning technique based on single-nucleotide variations (SNVs not to be confused with SNPs) (single-base differences in a patient). Any mutation involving single base change can be detected by this system. It requires prior knowledge of a DNA sequence, including differences between alleles, and uses primers whose 3' ends encompass the SNV (base pair buffer around SNV usually incorporated). PCR amplification under stringent conditions is much less efficient in the presence of a mismatch between template and primer, so successful amplification with an SNP-specific primer signals presence of the specific SNP or small deletions in a sequence. See SNP genotyping for more information.
- Arbitrarily amplified DNA is a family of DNA profiling methods that use arbitrary primers to amplify DNA of unknown sequence with the PCR reaction. They include random amplified polymorphic DNA (RAPD), arbitrarily primed PCR (AP-PCR), and DNA amplification fingerprinting (DAF). The arbitrary nature of the primers used in these methods target anonymous regions in a genome or engineered construct generating unique genetic fingerprints. This sets these techniques apart from standard PCR methodologies that require knowledge of the target sequence.
- Assembly PCR or Polymerase Cycling Assembly (PCA): artificial synthesis of long DNA sequences by performing PCR on a pool of long oligonucleotides with short overlapping segments. The oligonucleotides alternate between sense and antisense directions, and the overlapping segments determine the order of the PCR fragments, thereby selectively producing the final long DNA product.
- Asymmetric PCR: preferentially amplifies one DNA strand in a double-stranded DNA template. It is used in sequencing and hybridization probing where amplification of only one of the two complementary strands is required. PCR is carried out as usual, but with a great excess of the primer for the strand targeted for amplification. Because of the slow (arithmetic) amplification later in the reaction after the limiting primer has been used up, extra cycles of PCR are required. A recent modification on this process, known as Linear-After-The-Exponential-PCR (LATE-PCR), uses a limiting primer with a higher melting temperature (T_{m}) than the excess primer to maintain reaction efficiency as the limiting primer concentration decreases mid-reaction.
- Convective PCR: a pseudo-isothermal way of performing PCR. Instead of repeatedly heating and cooling the PCR mixture, the solution is subjected to a thermal gradient. The resulting thermal instability driven convective flow automatically shuffles the PCR reagents from the hot and cold regions repeatedly enabling PCR. Parameters such as thermal boundary conditions and geometry of the PCR enclosure can be optimized to yield robust and rapid PCR by harnessing the emergence of chaotic flow fields. Such convective flow PCR setup significantly reduces device power requirement and operation time.
- Dial-out PCR: a highly parallel method for retrieving accurate DNA molecules for gene synthesis. A complex library of DNA molecules is modified with unique flanking tags before massively parallel sequencing. Tag-directed primers then enable the retrieval of molecules with desired sequences by PCR.
- Digital PCR (dPCR): used to measure the quantity of a target DNA sequence in a DNA sample. The DNA sample is highly diluted so that after running many PCRs in parallel, some of them do not receive a single molecule of the target DNA. The target DNA concentration is calculated using the proportion of negative outcomes. Hence the name 'digital PCR'.
- Helicase-dependent amplification: similar to traditional PCR, but uses a constant temperature rather than cycling through denaturation and annealing/extension cycles. DNA helicase, an enzyme that unwinds DNA, is used in place of thermal denaturation.
- Hot start PCR: a technique that reduces non-specific amplification during the initial set up stages of the PCR. It may be performed manually by heating the reaction components to the denaturation temperature (e.g., 95 °C) before adding the polymerase. Specialized enzyme systems have been developed that inhibit the polymerase's activity at ambient temperature, either by the binding of an antibody or by the presence of covalently bound inhibitors that dissociate only after a high-temperature activation step. Hot-start/cold-finish PCR is achieved with new hybrid polymerases that are inactive at ambient temperature and are instantly activated at elongation temperature.
- In silico PCR (digital PCR, virtual PCR, electronic PCR, e-PCR) refers to computational tools used to calculate theoretical polymerase chain reaction results using a given set of primers (probes) to amplify DNA sequences from a sequenced genome or transcriptome. In silico PCR was proposed as an educational tool for molecular biology.
- Intersequence-specific PCR (ISSR): a PCR method for DNA fingerprinting that amplifies regions between simple sequence repeats to produce a unique fingerprint of amplified fragment lengths.
- Inverse PCR: is commonly used to identify the flanking sequences around genomic inserts. It involves a series of DNA digestions and self ligation, resulting in known sequences at either end of the unknown sequence.
- Ligation-mediated PCR: uses small DNA linkers ligated to the DNA of interest and multiple primers annealing to the DNA linkers; it has been used for DNA sequencing, genome walking, and DNA footprinting.
- Methylation-specific PCR (MSP): developed by Stephen Baylin and James G. Herman at the Johns Hopkins School of Medicine, and is used to detect methylation of CpG islands in genomic DNA. DNA is first treated with sodium bisulfite, which converts unmethylated cytosine bases to uracil, which is recognized by PCR primers as thymine. Two PCRs are then carried out on the modified DNA, using primer sets identical except at any CpG islands within the primer sequences. At these points, one primer set recognizes DNA with cytosines to amplify methylated DNA, and one set recognizes DNA with uracil or thymine to amplify unmethylated DNA. MSP using qPCR can also be performed to obtain quantitative rather than qualitative information about methylation.
- Miniprimer PCR: uses a thermostable polymerase (S-Tbr) that can extend from short primers ("smalligos") as short as 9 or 10 nucleotides. This method permits PCR targeting to smaller primer binding regions, and is used to amplify conserved DNA sequences, such as the 16S (or eukaryotic 18S) rRNA gene.
- Multiplex ligation-dependent probe amplification (MLPA): permits amplifying multiple targets with a single primer pair, thus avoiding the resolution limitations of multiplex PCR (see below).
- Multiplex-PCR: consists of multiple primer sets within a single PCR mixture to produce amplicons of varying sizes that are specific to different DNA sequences. By targeting multiple genes at once, additional information may be gained from a single test-run that otherwise would require several times the reagents and more time to perform. Annealing temperatures for each of the primer sets must be optimized to work correctly within a single reaction, and amplicon sizes. That is, their base pair length should be different enough to form distinct bands when visualized by gel electrophoresis.
- Nanoparticle-assisted PCR (nanoPCR): some nanoparticles (NPs) can enhance the efficiency of PCR (thus being called nanoPCR), and some can even outperform the original PCR enhancers. It was reported that quantum dots (QDs) can improve PCR specificity and efficiency. Single-walled carbon nanotubes (SWCNTs) and multi-walled carbon nanotubes (MWCNTs) are efficient in enhancing the amplification of long PCR. Carbon nanopowder (CNP) can improve the efficiency of repeated PCR and long PCR, while zinc oxide, titanium dioxide and Ag NPs were found to increase the PCR yield. Previous data indicated that non-metallic NPs retained acceptable amplification fidelity. Given that many NPs are capable of enhancing PCR efficiency, it is clear that there is likely to be great potential for nanoPCR technology improvements and product development.
- Nested PCR: increases the specificity of DNA amplification, by reducing background due to non-specific amplification of DNA. Two sets of primers are used in two successive PCRs. In the first reaction, one pair of primers is used to generate DNA products, which besides the intended target, may still consist of non-specifically amplified DNA fragments. The product(s) are then used in a second PCR with a set of primers whose binding sites are completely or partially different from and located 3' of each of the primers used in the first reaction. Nested PCR is often more successful in specifically amplifying long DNA fragments than conventional PCR, but it requires more detailed knowledge of the target sequences.
- Overlap-extension PCR or Splicing by overlap extension (SOEing) : a genetic engineering technique that is used to splice together two or more DNA fragments that contain complementary sequences. It is used to join DNA pieces containing genes, regulatory sequences, or mutations; the technique enables creation of specific and long DNA constructs. It can also introduce deletions, insertions or point mutations into a DNA sequence.
- PAN-AC: uses isothermal conditions for amplification, and may be used in living cells.
- PAN-PCR: A computational method for designing bacterium typing assays based on whole genome sequence data.
- Quantitative PCR (qPCR): used to measure the quantity of a target sequence (commonly in real-time). It quantitatively measures starting amounts of DNA, cDNA, or RNA. Quantitative PCR is commonly used to determine whether a DNA sequence is present in a sample and the number of its copies in the sample. Quantitative PCR has a very high degree of precision. Quantitative PCR methods use fluorescent dyes, such as Sybr Green, EvaGreen or fluorophore-containing DNA probes, such as TaqMan, to measure the amount of amplified product in real time. It is also sometimes abbreviated to RT-PCR (real-time PCR) but this abbreviation should be used only for reverse transcription PCR. qPCR is the appropriate contractions for quantitative PCR (real-time PCR).
- Reverse complement PCR (RC-PCR): Allows the addition of functional domains or sequences of choice to be appended independently to either end of the generated amplicon in a single closed tube reaction. This method generates target specific primers within the reaction by the interaction of universal primers (which contain the desired sequences or domains to be appended) and RC probes.
- Reverse transcription PCR (RT-PCR): for amplifying DNA from RNA. Reverse transcriptase reverse transcribes RNA into cDNA, which is then amplified by PCR. RT-PCR is widely used in expression profiling, to determine the expression of a gene or to identify the sequence of an RNA transcript, including transcription start and termination sites. If the genomic DNA sequence of a gene is known, RT-PCR can be used to map the location of exons and introns in the gene. The 5' end of a gene (corresponding to the transcription start site) is typically identified by RACE-PCR (Rapid Amplification of cDNA Ends).
- RNase H-dependent PCR (rhPCR): a modification of PCR that utilizes primers with a 3' extension block that can be removed by a thermostable RNase HII enzyme. This system reduces primer-dimers and allows for multiplexed reactions to be performed with higher numbers of primers.
- Single specific primer-PCR (SSP-PCR): allows the amplification of double-stranded DNA even when the sequence information is available at one end only. This method permits amplification of genes for which only a partial sequence information is available, and allows unidirectional genome walking from known into unknown regions of the chromosome.
- Solid phase PCR: encompasses multiple meanings, including polony amplification (where PCR colonies are derived in a gel matrix, for example), bridge PCR (primers are covalently linked to a solid-support surface), conventional solid phase PCR (where Asymmetric PCR is applied in the presence of solid support bearing primer with sequence matching one of the aqueous primers) and Enhanced Solid Phase PCR (where conventional solid phase PCR can be improved by employing high Tm and nested solid support primer with optional application of a thermal 'step' to favour solid support priming).
- Suicide PCR: typically used in paleogenetics or other studies where avoiding false positives and ensuring the specificity of the amplified fragment is the highest priority. It was originally described in a study to verify the presence of the microbe Yersinia pestis in dental samples obtained from 14th Century graves of people supposedly killed by the plague during the medieval Black Death epidemic. The method prescribes the use of any primer combination only once in a PCR (hence the term "suicide"), which should never have been used in any positive control PCR reaction, and the primers should always target a genomic region never amplified before in the lab using this or any other set of primers. This ensures that no contaminating DNA from previous PCR reactions is present in the lab, which could otherwise generate false positives.
- Thermal asymmetric interlaced PCR (TAIL-PCR): for isolation of an unknown sequence flanking a known sequence. Within the known sequence, TAIL-PCR uses a nested pair of primers with differing annealing temperatures; a degenerate primer is used to amplify in the other direction from the unknown sequence.
- Touchdown PCR (Step-down PCR): a variant of PCR that aims to reduce nonspecific background by gradually lowering the annealing temperature as PCR cycling progresses. The annealing temperature at the initial cycles is usually a few degrees (3–5 °C) above the T_{m} of the primers used, while at the later cycles, it is a few degrees (3–5 °C) below the primer T_{m}. The higher temperatures give greater specificity for primer binding, and the lower temperatures permit more efficient amplification from the specific products formed during the initial cycles.
- Two-Tailed PCR is a technology developed by Professor Mikael Kubista to amplify short template molecules like microRNAs and even shorter using a hairpin primer that hybridizes to the target with both its 3' and 5'-ends.
- Universal Fast Walking: for genome walking and genetic fingerprinting using a more specific 'two-sided' PCR than conventional 'one-sided' approaches (using only one gene-specific primer and one general primer—which can lead to artefactual 'noise') by virtue of a mechanism involving lariat structure formation. Streamlined derivatives of UFW are LaNe RAGE (lariat-dependent nested PCR for rapid amplification of genomic DNA ends), 5'RACE LaNe and 3'RACE LaNe.

== History ==
Diagrammatic representation of an example primer pair. The use of primers in an in vitro assay to allow DNA synthesis was a major innovation that allowed the development of PCR.

The heat-resistant enzymes that are a key component in polymerase chain reaction (PCR) were discovered in the 1960s as a product of a microbial life form that lived in the superheated waters of Yellowstone's Mushroom Spring.

A 1971 paper in the Journal of Molecular Biology by Kjell Kleppe and co-workers in the laboratory of H. Gobind Khorana first described a method of using an enzymatic assay to replicate a short DNA template with primers in vitro. However, this early manifestation of the basic PCR principle did not receive much attention at the time and the invention of the PCR in 1983 is generally credited to Kary Mullis.

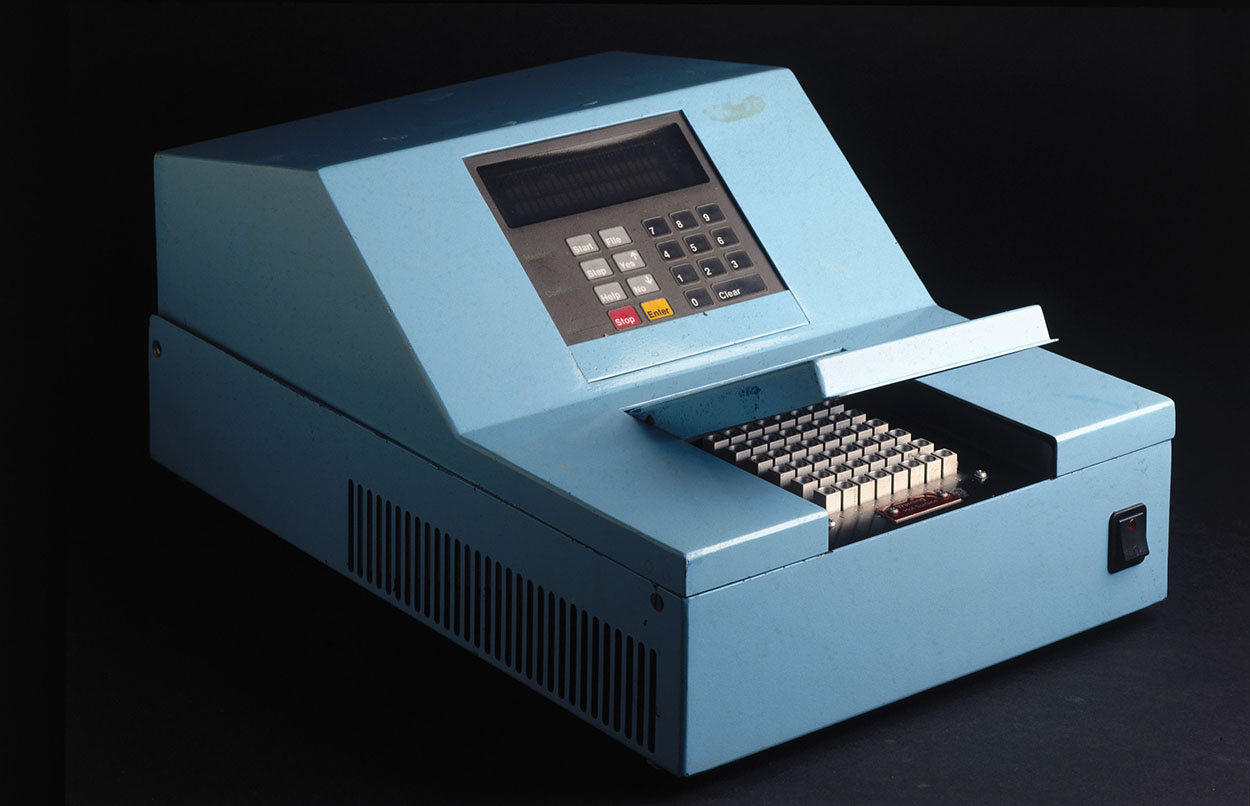
"Baby Blue", a 1986 prototype machine for doing PCR

When Mullis developed the PCR in 1983, he was working in Emeryville, California for Cetus Corporation, one of the first biotechnology companies, where he was responsible for synthesizing short chains of DNA. Mullis has written that he conceived the idea for PCR while cruising along the Pacific Coast Highway one night in his car. He was playing in his mind with a new way of analyzing changes (mutations) in DNA when he realized that he had instead invented a method of amplifying any DNA region through repeated cycles of duplication driven by DNA polymerase. In Scientific American, Mullis summarized the procedure: "Beginning with a single molecule of the genetic material DNA, the PCR can generate 100 billion similar molecules in an afternoon. The reaction is easy to execute. It requires no more than a test tube, a few simple reagents, and a source of heat." DNA fingerprinting was first used for paternity testing in 1988.

Mullis has credited his use of LSD as integral to his development of PCR: "Would I have invented PCR if I hadn't taken LSD? I seriously doubt it. I learnt that partly on psychedelic drugs."

Mullis and biochemist Michael Smith, who had developed other essential ways of manipulating DNA, were jointly awarded the Nobel Prize in Chemistry in 1993, seven years after Mullis and his colleagues at Cetus first put his proposal to practice. Mullis's 1985 paper with R. K. Saiki and H. A. Erlich, "Enzymatic Amplification of β-globin Genomic Sequences and Restriction Site Analysis for Diagnosis of Sickle Cell Anemia"—the PCR invention —was honored by a Citation for Chemical Breakthrough Award from the Division of History of Chemistry of the American Chemical Society in 2017.

At the core of the PCR method is the use of a suitable DNA polymerase able to withstand the high temperatures of >90 °C (194 °F) required for separation of the two DNA strands in the DNA double helix after each replication cycle. The DNA polymerases initially employed for in vitro experiments presaging PCR were unable to withstand these high temperatures. So the early procedures for DNA replication were very inefficient and time-consuming, and required large amounts of DNA polymerase and continuous handling throughout the process.

The discovery in 1976 of Taq polymerase—a DNA polymerase purified from the thermophilic bacterium, Thermus aquaticus in work co-authored by Alice Chien Chang—which naturally lives in hot (50 to 80 °C (122 to 176 °F)) environments such as hot springs—paved the way for dramatic improvements of the PCR method. The DNA polymerase isolated from T. aquaticus is stable at high temperatures remaining active even after DNA denaturation, thus obviating the need to add new DNA polymerase after each cycle. This allowed an automated thermocycler-based process for DNA amplification.

=== Patent disputes ===
The PCR technique was patented by Kary Mullis and assigned to Cetus Corporation, where Mullis worked when he invented the technique in 1983. The Taq polymerase enzyme was also covered by patents. There have been several lawsuits related to the technique brought by DuPont. The Swiss pharmaceutical company Hoffmann-La Roche purchased the rights to the patents in 1992. The last of the commercial PCR patents expired in 2017.

A related patent battle over the Taq polymerase enzyme is still ongoing in several jurisdictions around the world between Roche and Promega. The legal arguments have extended beyond the lives of the original PCR and Taq polymerase patents, which expired on 28 March 2005.

== See also ==
- COVID-19 testing
- DNA spiking
- Loop-mediated isothermal amplification
- Selector technique
- Thermus thermophilus
- Pfu DNA polymerase
