= Multiplex polymerase chain reaction =

Use of polymerase chain reaction to amplify several different DNA

Multiplex polymerase chain reaction (Multiplex PCR) refers to the use of polymerase chain reaction to amplify several different DNA sequences simultaneously (as if performing many separate PCRs all together in a single vessel). This process amplifies DNA in samples using multiple primers and a temperature-mediated DNA polymerase in a thermal cycler. The primer design for all primer pairs must be optimized so that all primer pairs can work at the same annealing temperature during PCR.

Multiplex-PCR was first described in 1988 as a method to detect deletions in the dystrophin gene. It has also been used with the steroid sulfatase gene. In 2008, multiplex-PCR was used for analysis of microsatellites and SNPs. In 2020, RT-PCR multiplex assays were designed that combined multiple gene targets from the Centers for Disease Control in a single reaction to increase molecular testing accessibility and throughput for SARS-CoV-2 diagnostics.

Multiplex-PCR consists of multiple primer sets within a single PCR mixture to produce amplicons of varying sizes that are specific to different DNA sequences. By targeting multiple sequences at once, additional information may be gained from a single test run that otherwise would require several times the reagents and more time to perform. Annealing temperatures for each of the primer sets must be optimized to work correctly within a single reaction, and amplicon sizes, i.e., their base pair length, should be different enough to form distinct bands when visualized by gel electrophoresis. Alternatively, if amplicon sizes overlap, the different amplicons may be differentiated and visualised using primers that have been labeled with different color fluorescent dyes. Commercial multiplexing kits for PCR are available and used by many forensic laboratories to amplify degraded DNA samples.

== Applications ==
Some of the applications of multiplex PCR include:

1. Pathogen Identification
2. High Throughput SNP Genotyping
3. Mutation Analysis
4. Gene Deletion Analysis
5. Template Quantitation
6. Linkage Analysis
7. RNA Detection
8. Forensic Studies
9. Diet Analysis
