= Taq polymerase =

Thermostable form of DNA polymerase I used in polymerase chain reaction

DNA polymerase I, thermostable
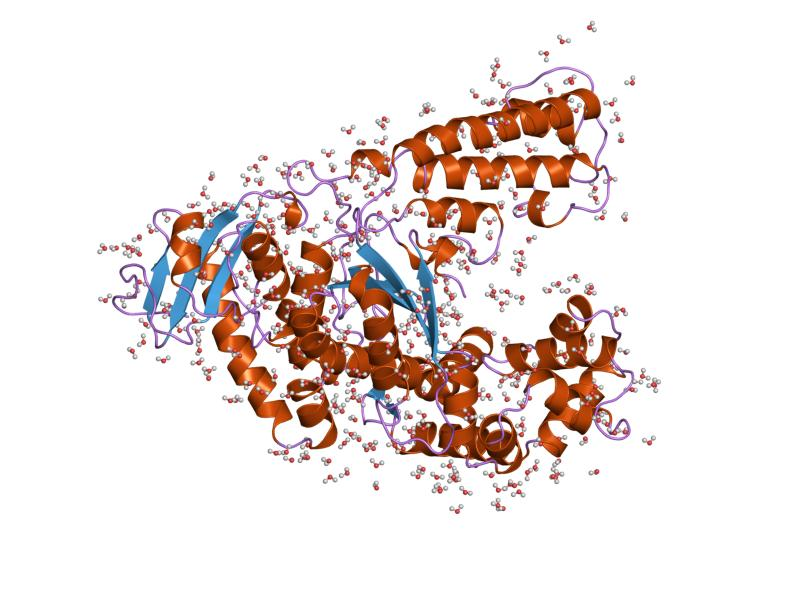
- Large (Klenow) fragment of Taq polA, containing the polA and vestigial domains

Identifiers
- Organism: Thermus aquaticus
- Symbol: polA
- Orthologs: OMA: entry
- UniProt: P19821
Search for
- Structures: Swiss-model
- Domains: InterPro

Taq polymerase is a thermostable DNA polymerase named after the thermophilic bacterium Thermus aquaticus, from which it was originally isolated by master's student Alice Chien et al. in 1976. Its name is often abbreviated to Taq or Taq pol. It is frequently used in the polymerase chain reaction (PCR), a method for greatly amplifying the quantity of short segments of DNA. It possesses a 5' → 3' polymerase activity and a 5' flap endonuclease activity. It has a theoretical molecular weight of 94 kDa.

T. aquaticus is a bacterium that lives in hot springs and hydrothermal vents, and Taq polymerase was identified as an enzyme able to withstand the protein-denaturing conditions (high temperature) required during PCR. Therefore, it replaced the DNA polymerase from E. coli originally used in PCR.

== Enzymatic properties ==
Taq's optimum temperature for activity is 75–80 °C, with a half-life of greater than 2 hours at 92.5 °C, 40 minutes at 95 °C and 9 minutes at 97.5 °C; it can replicate a 1000 base pair strand of DNA in less than 10 seconds at 72 °C. At 75–80 °C, Taq reaches its optimal polymerization rate of about 150 nucleotides per second per enzyme molecule, and any deviations from the optimal temperature range inhibit the extension rate of the enzyme. A single Taq synthesizes about 60 nucleotides per second at 70 °C, 24 nucleotides/sec at 55 °C, 1.5 nucleotides/sec at 37 °C, and 0.25 nucleotides/sec at 22 °C. At temperatures above 90 °C, Taq demonstrates very little or no activity at all, but the enzyme itself does not denature and remains intact. Presence of certain ions in the reaction vessel also affects specific activity of the enzyme. Small amounts of potassium chloride (KCl) and magnesium ion (Mg^{2+}) promote Taq's enzymatic activity. Taq polymerase is maximally activated at 50mM KCl, while optimal Mg^{2+} concentration is determined by the concentration of nucleoside triphosphates (dNTPs). High concentrations of KCl and Mg^{2+} inhibit Taq's activity. The common metal ion chelator EDTA directly binds to Taq in the absence of these metal ions.

One of Taq's drawbacks is its lack of 3' to 5' exonuclease proofreading activity resulting in relatively low replication fidelity. Originally its error rate was measured at about 1 in 9,000 nucleotides. Use of recombinant DNA technology has enabled the use of an E. coli strain that carries the Taq DNA Polymerase gene from Thermus aquaticus YT-1 with an error rate of approximately 1 in 285 x 10^{-6} bases.

Some thermostable DNA polymerases have been isolated from other thermophilic bacteria and archaea, such as Pfu DNA polymerase, possessing a proofreading activity, and are being used instead of (or in combination with) Taq for high-fidelity amplification. Fidelity can vary widely between Taqs, which has profound effects in downstream sequencing applications.

Taq makes DNA products that have A (adenine) overhangs at their 3' ends. This may be useful in TA cloning, whereby a cloning vector (such as a plasmid) that has a T (thymine) 3' overhang is used, which complements with the A overhang of the PCR product, thus enabling ligation of the PCR product into the plasmid vector.

== In PCR ==
In the early 1980s, Kary Mullis was working at Cetus Corporation on the application of synthetic DNAs to biotechnology. He was familiar with the use of DNA oligonucleotides as probes for binding to target DNA strands, as well as their use as primers for DNA sequencing and cDNA synthesis. In 1983, he began using two primers, one to hybridize to each strand of a target DNA, and adding DNA polymerase to the reaction. This led to exponential DNA replication, greatly amplifying discrete segments of DNA between the primers.

However, after each round of replication the mixture needs to be heated above 90 °C to denature the newly formed DNA, allowing the strands to separate and act as templates in the next round of amplification. This heating step also inactivates the DNA polymerase that was in use before the discovery of Taq polymerase, the Klenow fragment (sourced from E. coli). Taq polymerase is well-suited for this application because it is able to withstand the temperature of 95 °C which is required for DNA strand separation without denaturing.

Use of the thermostable Taq enables running the PCR at high temperature (~60 °C and above), which facilitates high specificity of the primers and reduces the production of nonspecific products, such as primer dimer. Also, use of a thermostable polymerase eliminates the need to add new enzyme to each round of thermocycling. A single closed tube in a relatively simple machine can be used to carry out the entire process. Thus, the use of Taq polymerase was the key idea that made PCR applicable to a large variety of molecular biology problems concerning DNA analysis.

== Patent issues ==
Hoffmann-La Roche eventually bought the PCR and Taq patents from Cetus for $330 million, from which it may have received up to $2 billion in royalties. In 1989, Science Magazine named Taq polymerase its first "Molecule of the Year". Kary Mullis received the Nobel Prize in Chemistry in 1993, the only one awarded for research performed at a biotechnology company. By the early 1990s, the PCR technique with Taq polymerase was being used in many areas, including basic molecular biology research, clinical testing, and forensics. It also began to find a pressing application in direct detection of the HIV in AIDS.

In December 1999, U.S. District Judge Vaughn Walker ruled that the 1990 patent involving Taq polymerase was issued, in part, on misleading information and false claims by scientists with Cetus Corporation. The ruling supported a challenge by Promega Corporation against Hoffman-La Roche, which purchased the Taq patents in 1991. Judge Walker cited previous discoveries by other laboratories, including the laboratory of John Trela at the University of Cincinnati department of biological sciences, as the basis for the ruling.

== Domain structure ==
Taq polymerase, exonuclease
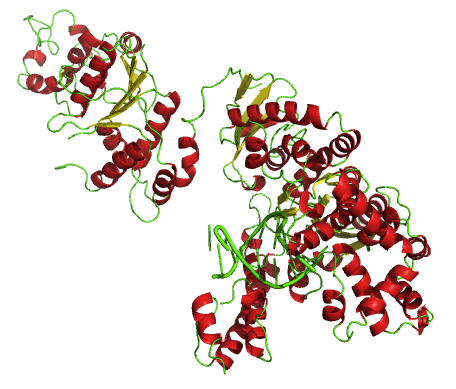
- Full Taq DNA polymerase bound to a DNA octamer

Identifiers
- Symbol: Taq-exonuc
- Pfam: PF09281
- InterPro: IPR015361
- SCOP2: 1qtm / SCOPe / SUPFAM
Available protein structures:
- PDB: IPR015361 PF09281 (ECOD; PDBsum)
- AlphaFold: IPR015361; PF09281

Taq Pol A has an overall structure similar to that of E. coli PolA. The middle 3'–5' exonuclease domain responsible for proofreading has been dramatically changed and is not functional. It has a functional 5'-3' exonuclease domain at the amino terminal, described below.

=== Exonuclease domain ===
Taq polymerase exonuclease is a domain found in the amino-terminal of Taq DNA polymerase I (thermostable). It assumes a ribonuclease H-like motif. The domain confers 5'-3' exonuclease activity to the polymerase.

Unlike the same domain in E. coli, which would degrade primers and must be removed by digestion for PCR use, this domain is not said to degrade the primer. This activity is used in the TaqMan probe: as the daughter strands are formed, the probes complementary to the template come in contact with the polymerase and are cleaved into fluorescent pieces.

=== Binding with DNA ===
Taq polymerase is bound at its polymerase active-site cleft with the blunt end of duplex DNA. As the Taq polymerase is in contact with the bound DNA, its side chains form hydrogen bonds with the purines and pyrimidines of the DNA. The same region of Taq polymerase that has bonded to DNA also binds with exonuclease. These structures bound to the Taq polymerase have different interactions.

=== Mutants ===
A site-directed mutagenesis experiment that improves the vestigial 3'-5' exonuclease activity by a factor of 2 has been reported, but it was never reported whether doing so decreases the error rate. Following a similar line of thought, chimera proteins have been made by cherry-picking domains from E. coli, Taq, and T. neapolitana polymerase I. Swapping out the vestigial domain for a functional one from E. coli created a protein with proof-reading ability but a lower optimal temperature and low thermostability.

Versions of the polymerase without the 5'-3' exonuclease domain has been produced, among which Klentaq or the Stoffel fragment are best known. The complete lack of exonuclease activity make these variants suitable for primers that exhibit secondary structure as well as for copying circular molecules. Other variations include using Klentaq with a high-fidelity polymerase, a Thermosequenase that recognizes substrates like T7 DNA polymerase does, mutants with higher tolerances to inhibitors, or "domain-tagged" versions that have an extra helix-hairpin-helix motif around the catalytic site to hold the DNA more tightly despite adverse conditions.

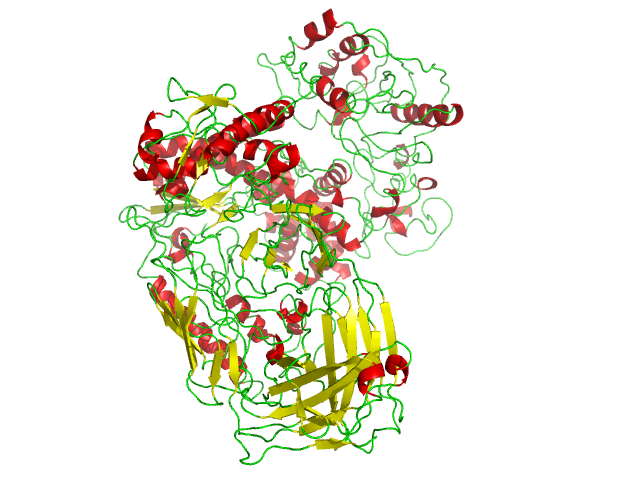
Taq Polymerase

=== Significance in disease detection ===
Because of the improvements Taq polymerase provided in PCR DNA replication: higher specificity, fewer nonspecific products, and simpler processes and equipment, it has been instrumental in the efforts made to detect diseases. "The use of Polymerase Chain Reaction (PCR) in infectious disease diagnosis, has resulted in an ability to diagnose early and treat appropriately diseases due to fastidious pathogens, determine the antimicrobial susceptibility of slow growing organisms, and ascertain the quantum of infection." The implementation of Taq polymerase has saved countless lives. It has served an essential role in the detection of many of the world's worst diseases, including: tuberculosis, streptococcal pharyngitis, atypical pneumonia, AIDS, measles, hepatitis, and ulcerative urogenital infections. PCR, the method used to recreate copies of specific DNA samples, makes disease detection possible by targeting a specific DNA sequence of a targeted pathogen from a patient's sample and amplifying trace amounts of the indicative sequences by copying them up to billions of times. Although this is the most accurate method of disease detection, especially for HIV, it is not performed as often as alternative, inferior tests because of the relatively high cost, labor, and time required.

The reliance upon Taq polymerase as a catalyst for the PCR replication process has been highlighted during the COVID-19 Pandemic of 2020. Shortages of the necessary enzyme have impaired the ability of countries worldwide to produce test kits for the virus. Without Taq polymerase, the disease detection process is much slower and tedious.

Despite the advantages of using Taq polymerase in PCR disease detection, the enzyme is not without its shortcomings. Retroviral diseases (HIV, HTLV-1, and HTLV-II) often include mutations from guanine to adenine in their genome. Mutations such as these are what allow PCR tests to detect the diseases but Taq polymerase’s relatively low fidelity rate makes the same G-to-A mutation occur and possibly yield a false positive test result.

== See also ==
- Biological machines
- DNA polymerase I
- DNA replication
- Enzyme catalysis
- Protein domain dynamics
