= Thermal cycler =

Laboratory equipment for cycling temperature

The thermal cycler (also known as a thermocycler, PCR machine or DNA amplifier) is a laboratory apparatus most commonly used to amplify segments of DNA via the polymerase chain reaction (PCR). Thermal cyclers may also be used in laboratories to facilitate other temperature-sensitive reactions, including restriction enzyme digestion or rapid diagnostics. The device has a thermal block with holes where tubes holding the reaction mixtures can be inserted. The cycler then raises and lowers the temperature of the block in discrete, pre-programmed steps.

== History ==
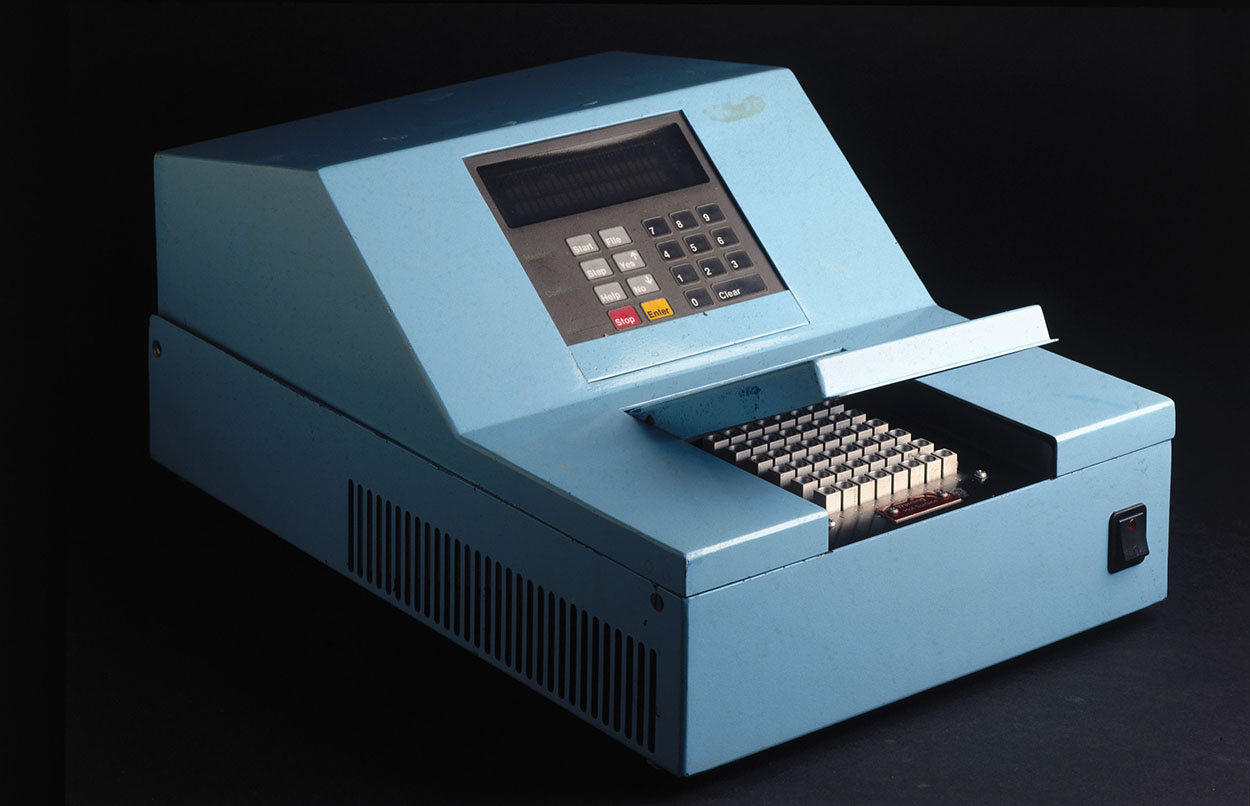
Baby Blue, a prototype automated thermal cycler built around 1986

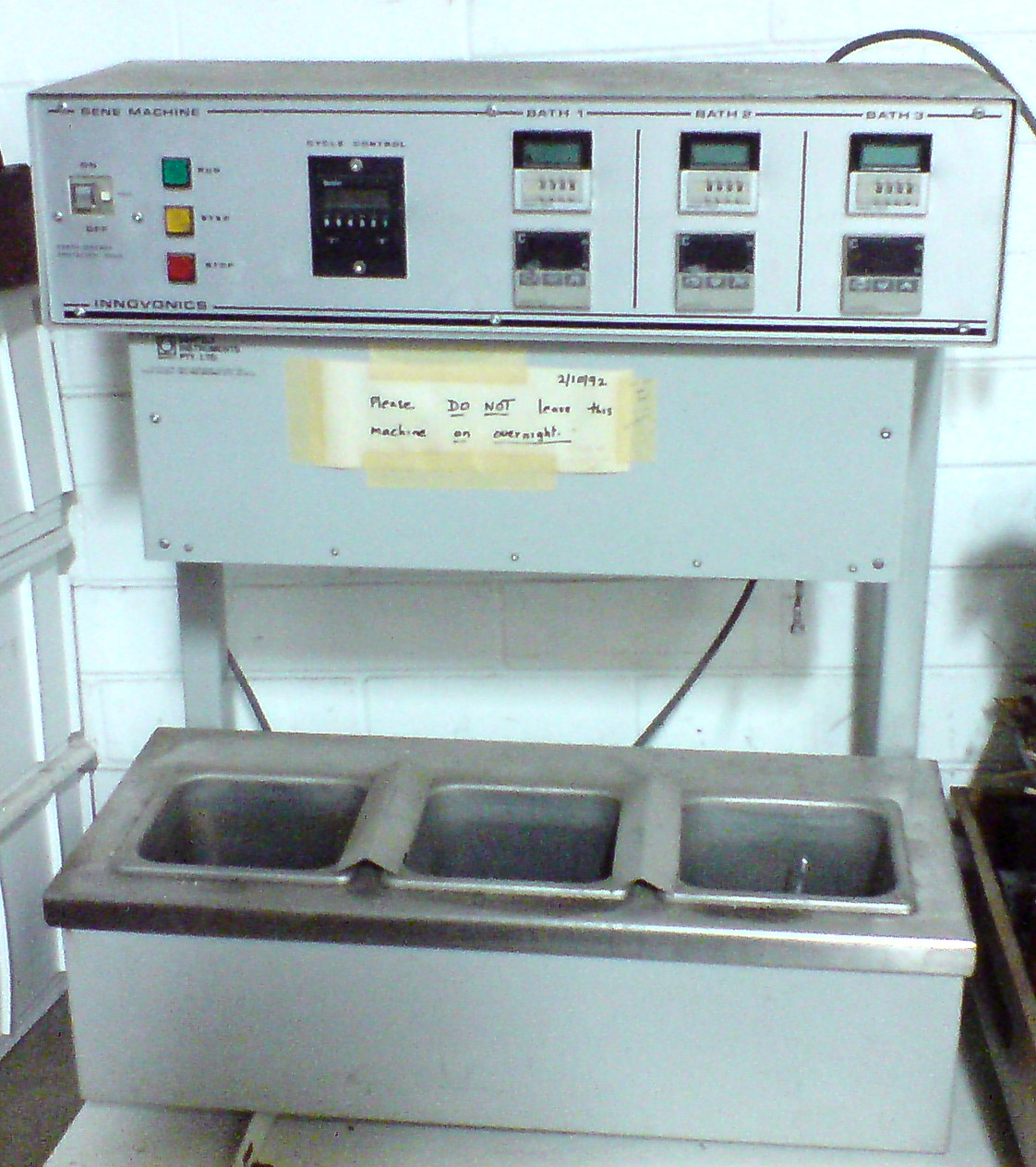
A very early PCR machine which, rather than cycling through different temperatures, uses three different water baths at constant temperatures between which samples are moved with a robotic arm

The earliest thermal cyclers were designed for use with the Klenow fragment of DNA polymerase I. Since this enzyme is destroyed during each heating step of the amplification process, new enzyme had to be added every cycle. This led to a cumbersome machine based on an automated pipettor, with open reaction tubes. Later, the PCR process was adapted to the use of thermostable DNA polymerase from Thermus aquaticus, which greatly simplified the design of the thermal cycler. While in some old machines the block is submerged in an oil bath to control temperature, in modern PCR machines a Peltier element is commonly used. Quality thermal cyclers often contain silver blocks to achieve fast temperature changes and uniform temperature throughout the block. Other cyclers have multiple blocks with high heat capacity, each of which is kept at a constant temperature, and the reaction tubes are moved between them by means of an automated process. Miniaturized thermal cyclers have been created in which the reaction mixture moves via channel through hot and cold zones on a microfluidic chip. Thermal cyclers designed for quantitative PCR have optical systems which enable fluorescence to be monitored during reaction cycling.

== Modern innovation ==
Modern thermal cyclers are equipped with a heated lid that presses against the lids of the reaction tubes. This prevents condensation of water from the reaction mixtures on the insides of the lids. Traditionally, a layer of mineral oil was used for this purpose. Some thermal cyclers are equipped with a fully adjustable heated lid to allow for nonstandard or diverse types of PCR plasticware.

Some thermal cyclers are equipped with multiple blocks allowing several different PCRs to be carried out simultaneously. Some models also have a gradient function to allow for different temperatures in different parts of the block. This is particularly useful when testing suitable annealing temperatures for PCR primers.

video shows working of three commercially available thermal cycler machines, the first one uses Peltier Element and one the available product is eppendorf Mastercycler® X50s, these are the most widely used thermal cyclers in the market. the second one uses a Resistive heater, miniPCR mini 16x QP-1000-16 uses this technology. the third one uses a Resistive Heating Element and does not have any Block in which the samples are kept unlike other technologies, samples are placed in a rotor - EP EP2687294A1, Quintel, "Rotor for a thermal cycler and thermal cycler", published 2022-01-22, Rotor-Gene Q MDx 5plex HRM (CA) uses this technology.

	Peltier based	Resistive Heating Element	Air Chamber
Commercially available machines	Eppendorff Mastercycler X50s	miniPCR mini 16x QP-1000-16	Rotor-Gene Q MDx 5plex HRM (CA)
Thermal Elements	Peltier Element	Resistive Heating	Resistive Heating
Lid Heater	yes	no	no
Heating Rate	<10 °C/Sec	<4 °C/Sec	>15 °C/Sec
Cooling Rate	<5 °C/Sec	<2.5 °C/Sec	>20 °C/Sec
Gradient Temperature	yes	no	no
Temperature uniformity	0.15 °C	0.5 °C	0.02 °C
Power consumption	<850 W	<72 W	<520 W
