= Molecular marker =

Molecule which encodes information about its source

In molecular biology and other fields, a molecular marker is a molecule, sampled from some source, that gives information about its source. For example, DNA is a molecular marker that gives information about the organism from which it was taken. For another example, some proteins can be molecular markers of Alzheimer's disease in a person from which they are taken. Molecular markers may be non-biological. Non-biological markers are often used in environmental studies.

== Genetic markers ==
In genetics, a molecular marker (identified as genetic marker) is a fragment of DNA that is associated with a certain location within the genome. Molecular markers are used in molecular biology and biotechnology to identify a particular sequence of DNA in a pool of unknown DNA.

=== Types of genetic markers ===
There are many types of genetic markers, each with particular limitations and strengths. Within genetic markers there are three different categories: "First Generation Markers", "Second Generation Markers", and "New Generation Markers". These types of markers may also identify dominance and co-dominance within the genome. Identifying dominance and co-dominance with a marker may help identify heterozygotes from homozygotes within the organism. Co-dominant markers are more beneficial because they identify more than one allele thus enabling someone to follow a particular trait through mapping techniques. These markers allow for the amplification of particular sequence within the genome for comparison and analysis.

Molecular markers are effective because they identify an abundance of genetic linkage between identifiable locations within a chromosome and are able to be repeated for verification. They can identify small changes within the mapping population enabling distinction between a mapping species, allowing for segregation of traits and identity. They identify particular locations on a chromosome, allowing for physical maps to be created. Lastly they can identify how many alleles an organism has for a particular trait (bi allelic or poly allelic).

Genomic markers as mentioned, have particular strengths and weakness, so, consideration and knowledge of the markers is necessary before use. For instance, a RAPD marker is dominant (identifying only one band of distinction) and it may be sensitive to reproducible results. This is typically due to the conditions in which it was produced. RAPD's are used also under the assumption that two samples share a same locus when a sample is produced. Different markers may also require different amounts of DNA. RAPD's may only need 0.02 ug of DNA while an RFLP marker may require 10 ug of DNA extracted from it to produce identifiable results. currently, SNP markers have turned out to be a potential tool in breeding programs in several crops.

Some commonly used types of genetic markers are:

- RFLP (or Restriction fragment length polymorphism)
- SSLP (or Simple sequence length polymorphism)
- AFLP (or Amplified fragment length polymorphism)
- AAD (or Arbitrarily amplified DNA)
- RAPD (or Random amplification of polymorphic DNA)
- DAF (or DNA amplification fingerprinting)
- AP-PCR (or Arbitrarily primed PCR)
- VNTR (or Variable number tandem repeat)
- SSCP (or Single-strand conformation polymorphism)
- SSR Microsatellite polymorphism, (or Simple sequence repeat)
- SNP (or Single nucleotide polymorphism)
- STR (or Short tandem repeat)
- SFP (or Single feature polymorphism)
- DArT (or Diversity Arrays Technology)
- RAD markers (or Restriction site associated DNA markers)
- STS (using Sequence-tagged sites)

== Mapping of genetic markers ==
Molecular mapping aids in identifying the location of particular markers within the genome. There are two types of maps that may be created for analysis of genetic material. First, is a physical map, that helps identify the location of where you are on a chromosome as well as which chromosome you are on. Secondly there is a linkage map that identifies how particular genes are linked to other genes on a chromosome. This linkage map may identify distances from other genes using (cM) centiMorgans as a unit of measurement. Co-dominant markers can be used in mapping, to identify particular locations within a genome and can represent differences in phenotype. Linkage of markers can help identify particular polymorphisms within the genome. These polymorphisms indicate slight changes within the genome that may present nucleotide substitutions or rearrangement of sequence. When developing a map it is beneficial to identify several polymorphic distinctions between two species as well as identify similar sequences between two species.

== Application in plant sciences ==
When using molecular markers to study the genetics of a particular crop, it must be remembered that markers have restrictions. It should first be assessed what the genetic variability is within the organism being studied. Analyze how identifiable particular genomic sequence, near or in candidate genes. Maps can be created to determine distances between genes and differentiation between species.

Genetic markers can aid in the development of new novel traits that can be put into mass production. These novel traits can be identified using molecular markers and maps. Particular traits such as color, may be controlled by just a few genes. Qualitative traits (requires less than 2 genes) such as color, can be identified using MAS (marker assisted selection). Once a desired marker is found, it is able to be followed within different filial generations. An identifiable marker may help follow particular traits of interest when crossing between different genus or species, with the hopes of transferring particular traits to offspring.

One example of using molecular markers in identifying a particular trait within a plant is, Fusarium head blight in wheat. Fusarium head blight can be a devastating disease in cereal crops but certain varieties or offspring or varieties may be resistant to the disease. This resistance is inferred by a particular gene that can be followed using MAS (Marker Assisted Selection) and QTL (Quantitative Trait Loci). QTLs identify particular variants within phenotypes or traits and typically identify where the GOI (Gene of Interest) is located. Once the cross has been made, sampling of offspring may be taken and evaluated to determine which offspring inherited the traits and which offspring did not. This type of selection is becoming more beneficial to breeders and farmers because it is reducing the amount of herbicides, fungicides and insecticides needed to be used on crops. Another way to insert a GOI is through mechanical or bacterial transmission. This is more difficult but may save time and money.

=== Applications of markers in cereal breeding ===
1. Assessing variability of genetic differences and characteristics within a species.
2. Identification and fingerprinting of genotypes.
3. Estimating genetic distances between species and offspring.
4. Identifying location of QTLs.
5. Identification of DNA sequence from useful candidate genes.

=== Applications of markers in aquaculture ===
1. Species identification.
2. Genetic variation and population structure study in natural populations.
3. Comparison between wild and hatchery populations.
4. Assessment of demographic bottlenecks in natural populations.
5. Marker assisted breeding.

== Biochemical markers ==
Biochemical markers are generally the protein marker. These are based on the change in the sequence of amino acids in a protein molecule. The most important protein marker is alloenzyme. Alloenzymes are variant forms of an enzyme that are coded by different alleles at the same locus and this alloenzymes differs from species to species. So for detecting the variation alloenzymes are used. These markers are type-i markers.

Advantages:

- Co-dominant markers.
- Less price.

Disadvantages:

- Require prior information.
- Low polymorphism power.

Applications:

- Linkage mapping.
- Population studies.

== See also ==
- Biomarker
- They are very useful to know the genetic stability of a particular organism Biosignature
