= Genetic marker =

Gene or DNA sequence with a known location on a chromosome

The DNA marker sequence varies between individuals of a species and can be used to distinguish between two parents or between parents and offspring.

A genetic marker is a gene or DNA sequence with a known location on a chromosome that can be used to identify individuals or species. It can be described as a variation (which may arise due to mutation or alteration in the genomic loci) that can be observed. A genetic marker may be a short DNA sequence, such as a sequence surrounding a single base-pair change (single nucleotide polymorphism, SNP), or a long one, like minisatellites.

== Background ==
For many years, gene mapping was limited to identifying organisms by traditional phenotypes markers. This included genes that encoded easily observable characteristics, such as blood types or seed shapes. The insufficient number of these types of characteristics in several organisms limited the possible mapping efforts. This prompted the development of gene markers, which could identify genetic characteristics that are not readily observable in organisms (such as protein variation).

== Types ==
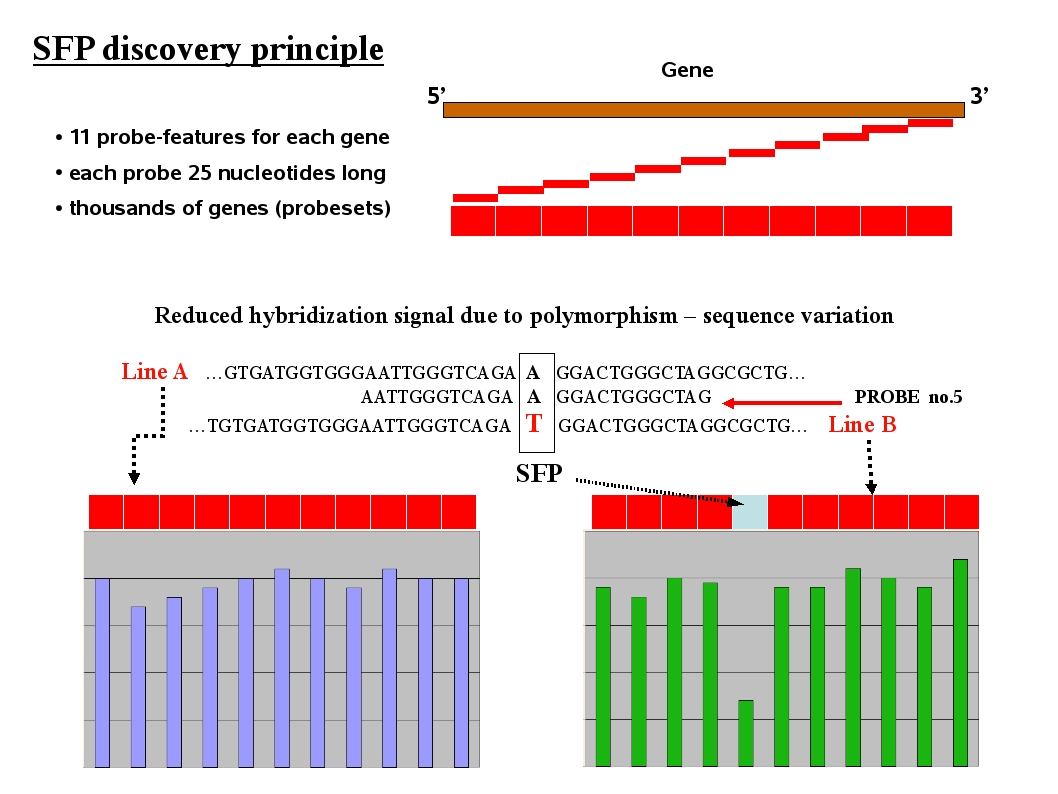
SFP discovery principle for gene probing

Some commonly used types of genetic markers are:

- RFLP (or Restriction fragment length polymorphism)
- SSLP (or Simple sequence length polymorphism)
- AFLP (or Amplified fragment length polymorphism)
- AAD (or Arbitrarily amplified DNA)
- RAPD (or Random amplification of polymorphic DNA)
- DAF (or DNA amplification fingerprinting)
- AP-PCR (or Arbitrarily primed PCR)
- VNTR (or Variable number tandem repeat)
- SSCP (or Single-strand conformation polymorphism)
- SSR Microsatellite polymorphism, (or Simple sequence repeat)
- SNP (or Single nucleotide polymorphism)
- STR (or Short tandem repeat)
- SFP (or Single feature polymorphism)
- DArT (or Diversity Arrays Technology)
- RAD markers (or Restriction site associated DNA markers)
- STS (using Sequence-tagged sites)

Molecular genetic markers can be divided into two classes: a) biochemical markers which detect variation at the gene product level such as changes in proteins and amino acids and b) molecular markers which detect variation at the DNA level such as nucleotide changes: deletion, duplication, inversion and/or insertion. Markers can exhibit two modes of inheritance, i.e. dominant/recessive or co-dominant. If the genetic pattern of homo-zygotes can be distinguished from that of hetero-zygotes, then a marker is said to be co-dominant. Generally co-dominant markers are more informative than the dominant markers.

== Uses ==
Genetic markers can be used to study the relationship between an inherited disease and its genetic cause (for example, a particular mutation of a gene that results in a defective protein). It is known that pieces of DNA that lie near each other on a chromosome tend to be inherited together. This property enables the use of a marker, which can then be used to determine the precise inheritance pattern of the gene that has not yet been exactly localized.

Genetic markers are employed in genealogical DNA testing for genetic genealogy to determine genetic distance between individuals or populations. Uniparental markers (on mitochondrial or Y chromosomal DNA) are studied for assessing maternal or paternal lineages. Autosomal markers are used for all ancestry.

Genetic markers have to be easily identifiable, associated with a specific locus, and highly polymorphic, because homozygotes do not provide any information. Detection of the marker can be direct by RNA sequencing, or indirect using allozymes.

Some of the methods used to study the genome or phylogenetics are RFLP, AFLP, RAPD, SSR. They can be used to create genetic maps of whatever organism is being studied.

There was a debate over what the transmissible agent of CTVT (canine transmissible venereal tumor) was. Many researchers hypothesized that virus like particles were responsible for transforming the cell, while others thought that the cell itself was able to infect other canines as an allograft. With the aid of genetic markers, researchers were able to provide conclusive evidence that the cancerous tumor cell evolved into a transmissible parasite. Furthermore, molecular genetic markers were used to resolve the issue of natural transmission, the breed of origin (phylogenetics), and the age of the canine tumor.

Genetic markers have also been used to measure the genomic response to selection in livestock. Natural and artificial selection leads to a change in the genetic makeup of the cell. The presence of different alleles due to a distorted segregation at the genetic markers is indicative of the difference between selected and non-selected livestock.

== See also ==
- Marker gene
- Molecular marker
- DNA marking
- Eukaryotic chromosome fine structure
- Repeated sequence (DNA)
- Genetic markers in Drosophila melanogaster
