= Genotyping =

Laboratory process

Genotyping is the process of determining differences in the genetic make-up (genotype) of an individual by examining the individual's DNA sequence using biological assays and comparing it to another individual's sequence or a reference sequence. It reveals the alleles an individual has inherited from their parents. Traditionally genotyping is the use of DNA sequences to define biological populations by use of molecular tools. It does not usually involve defining the genes of an individual.

== Techniques ==
=== Restriction Fragment Length Polymorphisms ===
A restriction fragment length polymorphism (RFLP) is a variation between different people at sites of the genome recognized by restriction enzymes. DNA containing different restriction sites will be cut by bacterial restriction enzymes differently and this can be seen using gel electrophoresis. When running the sample through, a successfully cleaved sample will contain two bands, while the sample with a different restriction site polymorphism will have one band as it had not been cleaved. A small change is enough to cause that restriction site to deny the restriction enzyme. This method is often used to trace the inheritance of DNA through families.

=== Random Amplified Polymorphic Detection ===
The random amplified polymorphic detection (RAPD) method relies on polymerase chain reaction (PCR) methods to amplify and isolate lengths of DNA fragments. Oligonucleotide primers are used which bind to denatured DNA fragments which have been produced through heat treatment. Two primers, one to define the starting point and ending point of PCR DNA synthesis, are used in this process. The fragments of DNA will range from two to three kilo base pairs and different primers are tried until the desired trait is isolated from the genome. This method is useful in locating small differences to differentiate between species.

=== Amplified Fragment Length Polymorphisms ===
The amplified fragment length polymorphism (AFLP) detection method is much like RAPD as it also relies on PCR amplification of DNA, with the difference being that this process is more precise but also more time-consuming than the RAPD counterpart. It also does not require random primers, instead the DNA is digested by restriction enzymes and the ends are then ligated to adaptors which allow for specification of strands when performing PCR amplification, this is where the improved precision of this method comes from.

=== DNA Microarrays/Beads ===
This process uses specific oligonucleotides which are placed on a DNA microarray which bind to complementary strands of DNA. This method is optimal for detecting single nucleotide polymorphisms (SNPs) in the DNA. The DNA will bind to the oligonucleotide bead up until one base pair before the SNP, where a single labeled nucleotide will be incorporated. This will be seen through dyes and fluorescently labeled proteins which indicate which SNP can be found at the locus of interest.

=== Genome Wide Association Studies ===
This is a method which takes the sequenced genome and compares different genomes to find genomic variants correlated with different traits or diseases. In this method, thousands of SNPs are studied and compared in sample sizes ranging up to millions of genomes. If certain SNPs are found to be statistically significant over the sample, the genes are identified which contain those SNPs and that gene is then correlated with the trait of interest. This method can be useful implications in the future for personalized medicine.

== Applications ==
=== Microbial ===
Genotyping applies to a broad range of individuals, including microorganisms. For example, viruses and bacteria can be genotyped. Genotyping in this context may help in controlling the spreading of pathogens, by tracing the origin of outbreaks. This area is often referred to as molecular epidemiology or forensic microbiology.

=== Human ===
Humans can also be genotyped. For example, when testing fatherhood or motherhood, scientists typically only need to examine 10 or 20 genomic regions (like SNPs).

When genotyping transgenic organisms, a single genomic region may be all that needs to be examined to determine the genotype. A single PCR assay is typically enough to genotype a transgenic mouse.

==== Ancient DNA Studies ====
Ancient DNA (aDNA) studies have been very important in understanding human evolution, but the samples are often highly degraded. This means there are certain steps and techniques required to ensure accuracy and readability of ancient genomes. To begin the researchers must ensure the DNA being studied is not contaminated with any recent DNA and only contains aDNA. To do this researchers will often look for terminal deamination as this is typically seen in aDNA. They will also often compare the sample with moderns human DNA to see if it is similar. Since aDNA can be sparse, certain techniques involve a targeted enrichment of the area of interest in the aDNA which can increase the resolution of these regions.

They also must work around the various DNA changes that can occur after the death of the individual. One very common form of damage is the deamination of cytosines. This causes the genome to be misread with C to T and G to A mistakes. This is often mitigated by treating the DNA with a USER reagent. This is a mix of uracil-DNA glycosylase and endonuclease VIII. This functions by removing the uracil and cleaving the site which it was removed from.

===== Pseudohaploid Genotyping =====
This genotyping method is often used for aDNA studies when the DNA reads available are low-coverage or when there is a large number of low coverage genomes being studied. This method does not determine the true diploid genotype but instead researchers will specify which SNPs they would like to focus on and read from the genome. Tools that allow this method include programs like pileupCaller and bam-caller.

===== Probabilistic Genotyping =====
Probabilistic genotyping is best used when the aDNA available is of high quality. This method finds the probability that the ancient genotype was present in the aDNA, often using modern DNA genotypes as reference samples. Programs used for this type of genotyping include snpAD, ATLAS, bcftools, GATK, or ANGSD.

==== Tuberculosis ====
Genotyping is used in the medical field to identify and control the spread of tuberculosis (TB). Originally, genotyping was only used to confirm outbreaks of tuberculosis; but with the evolution of genotyping technology it is now able to do far more. Advances in genotyping technology led to the realization that many cases of tuberculosis, including infected individuals living in the same household, were not actually linked. This caused the formation of universal genotyping in an attempt to understand transmission dynamics. Universal genotyping revealed complex transmission dynamics based on things like socio-epidemiological factors. This led to the use of polymerase chain reactions which allowed for faster detection of tuberculosis. This rapid detection method is used to prevent TB. The addition of whole genome sequencing (WGS) allowed for identification of strains of TB which could then be put in a chronological cluster map. These cluster maps show the origin of cases and the time in which those cases arose. This gives a much clearer picture of transmission dynamics and allows for better control and prevention of transmission. All of these different forms of genotyping are used together to detect TB, prevent its spread and trace the origin of infections. This has helped to reduce the number of TB cases.

=== Agricultural ===
Many types of genotyping are used in agriculture. One type that is used is genotyping by sequencing because it aids agriculture with crop breeding. For this purpose, SNPs are used as markers and RNA sequencing is used to look at gene expression in crops. The knowledge gained from this type of genotyping allows for selective breeding of crops in ways which benefit agriculture. In the case of alfalfa, the cell wall was improved through selective breeding that was made possible by this type of genotyping. These techniques have also resulted in the discovery of genes that provide resistance to diseases. A gene called Yr15 was discovered in wheat, which protects against a disease called yellow wheat rust. Selective breeding for the Yr15 gene then prevented yellow wheat rust, benefiting agriculture.

=== Sex Determination in Nonhuman Animals ===
==== Determining Sex in Birds ====
In avian species where external phenotypic sexual dimorphism is absent or subtle, such as monomorphic species in captivity and juveniles in the wild, sexing birds for research purposes can utilize molecular genetic methods. DNA samples be collected from feathers and blood of birds. Birds possess a ZW sex determination system, in which females are heterogametic (ZW) and males are homogametic (ZZ). This is in contrast to the XY sex determination system of humans where males are heterogametic (XY) and females are homogametic (XX).

A widely used genetic marker for avian sexing is the CHD1 gene, which exists in slightly different forms on the Z and W chromosomes, called CHD1Z and CHD1W, respectively. These gene variants differ in the number of base pairs, enabling their detection through amplification by PCR followed by gel electrophoresis separation.

===== CHD1 Primers for Genotyping =====
There are many well-developed and validated primers that amplify a certain region of the CHD1 gene that shows a difference in size between the W and Z chromosome variants. Five sets of two primers for the CHD1 gene, each (166F/279R, 1237L/1272H, 2550F/2718R, P8/P2, P3/P2) have been tested to show different lengths of PCR products in a wide range of roughly 80 bird species ranging from songbirds to chicken. These sets of primers contain one primer for each of the sex chromosomes. When amplified PCR products are separated via gel electrophoresis, males (ZZ) display a single band (two identical CHD1Z genes), while females (ZW) exhibit two bands corresponding to each gene variant of different sizes (CHD1Z and CHD1W). Sex can then be determined by identifying the number of bands for each bird being genotyped.

====== Limitations to CHD1 Genotyping ======
The CHD1 molecular sexing assay can be used in a wide range of applications, from conservation biology to sexing avian models of behaviour. PCR-based sex determination is of use when morphological indicators are absent or unavailable. Despite its ease of use and convenience, there are some limitations with using CHD1 as the main marker for determining sex. Because the nucleotide length difference between the CHD1W and CHD1Z gene varies between species, difficulties with genotypic sexing using the P2/P8 and 1237L/1272H CHD1 primers have been reported. As a result, alternative primers and markers have been provided to obtain more reliable genotyping results between species. These methods utilize different post-PCR modifications, and protocols, including Single Strand Conformation Polymorphism and Restriction Fragment Length Polymorphism that further processes CHD1 PCR products.

==== Determining Sex in Chinese soft-shelled turtles (Pelodiscus sinensis) ====
The Chinese soft-shell turtle determines sex genetically rather than through environmental conditions. This species has a ZZ/ZW sex chromosome system, where males have two Z chromosomes and females have one Z and one W chromosome. While some earlier studies suggested that incubation temperature could influence the sex of hatchlings, later research using both incubation experiments and chromosome analysis showed that temperature has no effect on sex outcome. Modern genetic techniques, including whole-genome sequencing and polymerase chain reaction (PCR), have helped identify DNA markers that are specific to females. These markers allow scientists to determine the sex of turtles at early life stages with high accuracy. Because juvenile turtles lack obvious physical differences between sexes, these genetic tools are especially useful in farming and conservation. In adulthood, male turtles typically grow larger and have thicker shells, showing clear physical differences from females. Understanding how sex is determined in the Chinese softshell turtle is important for managing breeding programs and maintaining healthy populations in aquaculture.

===== Development of PCR-Based Sex-Specific Genetic Markers =====
Genotyping studies in the Chinese softshell turtle have focused on identifying DNA sequences found only in females to enable accurate sex identification. One research team used whole-genome sequencing (WGS) to compare male and female genomes and found over 4 megabases of female-specific DNA. Based on this, they developed seven PCR primers including P44, P45, and PB1 which consistently amplified female-specific DNA bands. These primers were validated in over 160 turtles across eight populations and correctly identified female individuals at both adult and embryonic stages, even before gonads were visibly developed. To determine genetic sex, DNA from tissue or blood is extracted and amplified using polymerase chain reaction (PCR). The resulting DNA is then visualized using gel electrophoresis. In this process, females (ZW) produce two DNA bands resulting from the Z chromosome and the other from the W chromosome, whereas males (ZZ) show only a single Z band. These visible banding patterns provide a fast, accurate, and non-lethal way to determine sex at very early life stages.

A separate study used restriction site-associated DNA sequencing (RAD-seq) to identify genetic markers unique to female Chinese soft-shell turtles in support of early and accurate sex identification. Researchers analyzed DNA from male and female turtles and discovered two female-specific DNA fragments, from which they designed three primers named ps4085, ps3137s1, and ps3137s2. These markers were tested on 296 turtles from different populations and showed 100% accuracy in identifying females. The presence of these sex-specific sequences confirmed that the species follows a ZW-type sex determination system, where females are the heterogametic sex. The study demonstrated that RAD-seq is a reliable tool for developing molecular markers, offering practical benefits for aquaculture breeding and population monitoring through non-invasive genetic sexing methods.

These methods confirm that the Chinese soft-shell turtle has a ZW-type sex determination system and demonstrates how genotyping enables early sex identification by detecting W-linked DNA in embryos or hatchlings, before any morphological differences between sexes have developed during the maturation process. This makes these genetic techniques a valuable tool for breeding programs and conservation efforts.

===== Candidate Genes in Sex-Specific Genomic Regions =====
In addition to developing reliable sex-specific markers, recent genotyping studies have identified several candidate genes that may be involved in sexual differentiation. Whole-genome sequencing of the Chinese soft-shell turtle revealed over 4 megabases of female-specific DNA, from which seven primer sets were created to amplify W-linked sequences through PCR. Within these W-specific regions, researchers discovered genes with potential roles in sexual differentiation. The gene Ran is involved in nuclear transport and cell cycle regulation and may influence androgen signalling pathways important in gonadal development. Eif4et, a gene associated with the initiation of protein translation, could affect the expression of proteins critical for female differentiation. Crkl participates in multiple signaling pathways and has been linked to ovarian development, suggesting a role in establishing sexual phenotype. Moreover, two additional genes called LHX1 and FGF7 were found to be differentially expressed in the brains of males and females, indicating possible involvement in both growth and sex-regulatory pathways. Ongoing research into these candidate genes continues to progress the study in molecular sexing in the Chinese softshell turtle and contributes to a more detailed understanding of sexual differentiation in this species.

===== Applications of Genotyping in Chinese soft-shelled turtles =====
Genotyping techniques have become an important tool in aquaculture and conservation efforts involving the Chinese soft-shelled turtle. This species exhibits sexual dimorphism in growth, with males typically growing faster and developing larger, thicker carapaces than females. These traits make male turtles more economically valuable in farming, where faster-growing individuals reduce costs and increase yield. Since external sex differences are not visible at the hatchling or juvenile stage, DNA-based sexing methods enable farmers to identify and select male individuals early in development, allowing for the cultivation of all-male populations through selective breeding.

In conservation programs, genotyping is used to determine the sex ratios of natural or captive populations, which is critical for population management and long-term viability. This is particularly useful in hatchlings or young turtles where morphological sexing is impossible. PCR-based genotyping allows for non-invasive sex identification using DNA from small tissue or blood samples, making it suitable for use in protected or endangered populations without harming individuals. Moreover, understanding the genetic basis of sex determination in the Chinese softshell turtle helps inform broader research into reptilian sex systems and evolutionary biology.

Genotyping provides a valuable tool for sex identification in the Chinese softshell turtle, especially during early developmental stages when morphological differences between males and females are not yet visible. The ability to detect W-linked sequences through PCR enables early and accurate sex determination, which is particularly important in aquaculture settings where males are preferred for their larger size and commercial value. The identification of female-specific DNA markers allows for the development of molecular assays that can support breeding programs aimed at producing monosexual populations, thereby improving yield and economic efficiency. Genotyping has also enabled the discovery of candidate genes related to sex differentiation, offering new insights into the genetic basis of sex determination in this species.

===== Limitations of Current Genotyping Techniques =====
While genotyping offers clear advantages, it also has limitations that can affect its generalizability and long-term reliability. In Zhu et al.’s study, the developed sex-specific markers for the Chinese softshell turtle showed 100% accuracy during validation. However, the genetic diversity across regional populations raises the possibility that markers effective in one group may not perform identically in others. As additional sex-linked markers are discovered, it becomes increasingly important to validate them across different populations to account for potential mismatches between genotype and phenotype. This highlights the need to confirm marker effectiveness broadly to ensure accurate sex identification in diverse genetic backgrounds.

Another limitation involves the practicality of applying genotyping in field-based conservation settings. Although PCR-based methods are reliable in laboratories, their effectiveness in field environments can be affected by factors such as sample degradation, transportation issues, or limited infrastructure. These challenges may reduce the feasibility of widespread implementation in conservation programs operating in remote or low-resource areas.

There is also a need for ongoing updates to marker systems, as future studies may identify more universally effective or higher-resolution markers. Current tools are robust, but continued development is necessary to enhance their scalability and relevance across broader applications.

A further limitation of genotyping is that it only assesses DNA-level variation, which does not capture the functional dynamics of gene expression. For example, a separate transcriptome study using Single-Molecule Real-Time (SMRT) sequencing, which allows for the direct reading of full-length RNA transcripts, identified sex-biased genes not detected by genotyping alone. Female turtles showed higher expression of Smad4, Wif1, and 17β-hsd, while males expressed more Nkd2 and Prp18. These genes are involved in hormone-regulated pathways such as TGF-β and Wnt, both of which play critical roles in sex differentiation and development. Thus, integrating transcriptomic data with genotyping enhances the overall understanding of sex determination mechanisms in the Chinese softshell turtle.

==== Overview ====
Accurate sex determination is essential in laboratory animal research, especially when studying sex-linked traits, developmental pathways, or biological responses that differ between males and females. In neonatal mice, however, external sexual characteristics are underdeveloped or absent, making early identification challenging. Newborn mice are monomorphic, meaning males and females cannot be distinguished by external features at birth. For this reason, researchers increasingly rely on genotypic methods to determine sex as early as possible. Genotyping approaches, particularly those involving PCR, allow for early, reliable, and objective sex identification. These methods are often integrated into standard genotyping workflows, ensuring efficient and accurate classification of sex alongside other genetic markers.

==== Sry Gene Amplification ====
One of the most widely used molecular sexing techniques involves PCR amplification of the Sry gene, a sex-determining region located on the Y chromosome. This gene is present only in male mice and serves as a direct indicator of male genotype. DNA is typically extracted from tissue samples such as tail tips or fetal heads, and PCR is performed using Sry-specific primers. A housekeeping gene such as Gapdh is co-amplified to confirm PCR success and ensure accurate interpretation of results. The presence of the Sry gene product, which appears as a band at approximately 273 base pairs, indicates a male genotype, while its absence indicates a female. This method has demonstrated extremely high accuracy and is frequently used as the gold standard for validating other sexing techniques. Because it provides binary results and is applicable to all developmental stages, Sry genotyping remains a preferred method in both fetal and neonatal mouse research.

==== Rbm31x/y Simplex PCR Method ====
Another highly effective genotypic sexing method targets the Rbm31x and Rbm31y genes, which are homologous but differ by an 84-base pair deletion in the Y-linked version. In this assay, a single pair of primers is used to amplify both genes simultaneously. The PCR reaction yields a 269 base pair product in all samples, representing Rbm31x, and an additional 353 base pair product in males, representing Rbm31y. This results in a clear, two-band pattern for males and a single band for females. Developed by Tunster in 2017, the Rbm31x/y simplex PCR method is praised for its speed, efficiency, and low reagent use. The protocol requires only 15 microliter reactions, does not require DNA purification, and can be completed in under two hours. The clarity of results, combined with the ability to use crude lysates and standard gel electrophoresis, makes this method particularly suitable for high-throughput genotyping in early-stage mouse pups. Its reliability and simplicity have made it a valuable alternative to Sry genotyping in many labs.

==== Other PCR-Based Sexing Methods ====
Several other PCR-based sexing methods are available, each with unique advantages and limitations. One such method targets the Sly and Xlr genes. The Sly gene is located on the Y chromosome and produces a PCR product of approximately 280 base pairs, while the Xlr gene is located on the X chromosome and produces a much larger product around 685 base pairs. In this assay, males produce two distinct bands, and females produce only the Xlr band. The large size difference makes interpretation straightforward; however, amplification bias and the presence of nonspecific bands can occur in certain genetic backgrounds, which may complicate analysis.

Another option is the Kdm5c/Kdm5d assay, which targets X- and Y-linked versions of the Kdm5 gene. The Kdm5c gene product is 331 base pairs, while Kdm5d is 302 base pairs. Males produce both bands, and females produce only the Kdm5c band. While this method is fast and easy to perform, the small difference in size between the two products can make the bands difficult to resolve on standard gels. In such cases, higher-resolution agarose gels or longer electrophoresis times are needed to ensure accurate differentiation. Despite these challenges, both the Sly/Xlr and Kdm5c/Kdm5d methods are valid alternatives to Sry or Rbm31x/y-based sexing, particularly when used with optimized protocols.

==== Limitations of Genotypic Sexing ====
Although genotypic sexing provides high accuracy and objectivity, it is not without limitations. The process requires access to specialized equipment, such as thermocyclers, gel electrophoresis systems, and UV imaging stations, as well as the technical skill to extract and handle genomic DNA. While assays like the Rbm31x/y PCR are relatively cost-effective per reaction, the upfront costs of lab infrastructure and reagents can be substantial for smaller facilities or field-based research. Additionally, the processing time—from tissue collection and DNA extraction to PCR and gel interpretation—can span several hours, making it less practical for immediate on-site decisions or large-scale colony assessments without automation.

There is also a learning curve for researchers unfamiliar with PCR troubleshooting, as non-specific amplification, primer-dimer artifacts, or DNA degradation can all affect result quality. Moreover, genotypic sexing requires careful consideration of strain background and genetic mutations, especially in transgenic lines where Y chromosome rearrangements or deletions might interfere with primer binding. Despite being a robust standard in most cases, genotypic sexing is not completely immune to technical error and should be periodically validated with known control samples.

== Ethical concerns ==
The ethics of genotyping humans have been a topic of discussion. The rise of genotyping technologies will make it possible to screen large populations of people for genetic diseases and predispositions for disease. The benefits of population wide genotyping have been contended by ethical concerns on consent and general benefit of wide span screening.

=== Psychological ===
Genotyping identifies mutations that increase susceptibility of a person to develop a disease, but disease development is not guaranteed in most cases, which can cause psychological damage.

=== Discrimination ===
Discrimination can arise from various genetic markers identified by genotyping, such as athletic advantages or disadvantages in professional sports or risk of disease development later in life.

=== Availability ===
Much of the ethical concerns surrounding genotyping arise from information availability, as in who can access the genotype of an individual in various contexts.

== See also ==
- Mendelian error – Error in the mendelian inheritance
- Quantitative trait locus – DNA locus associated with variation in a quantitative trait
- SNP genotyping – Measurement of genetic variations
