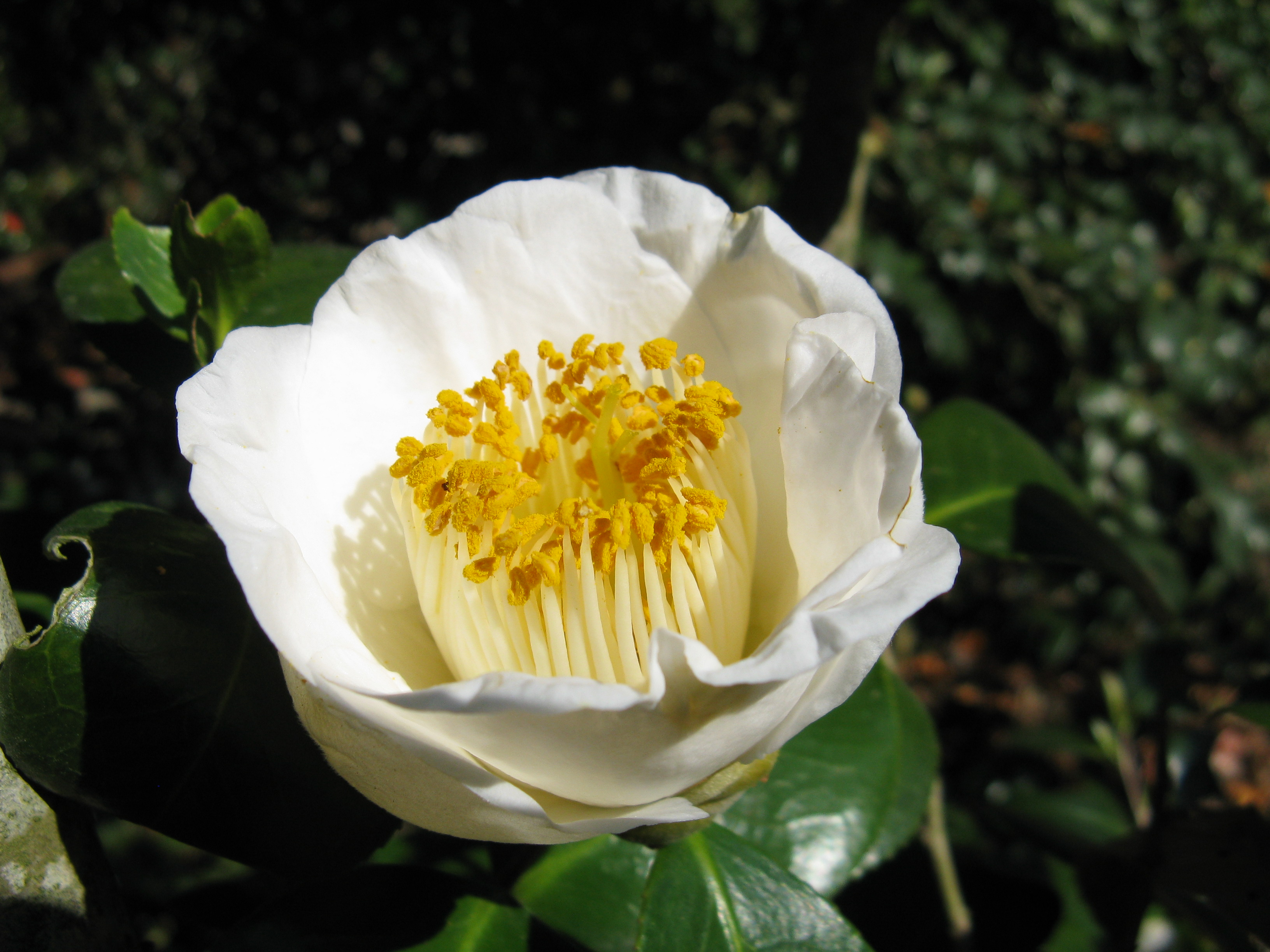
- Camellia japonica
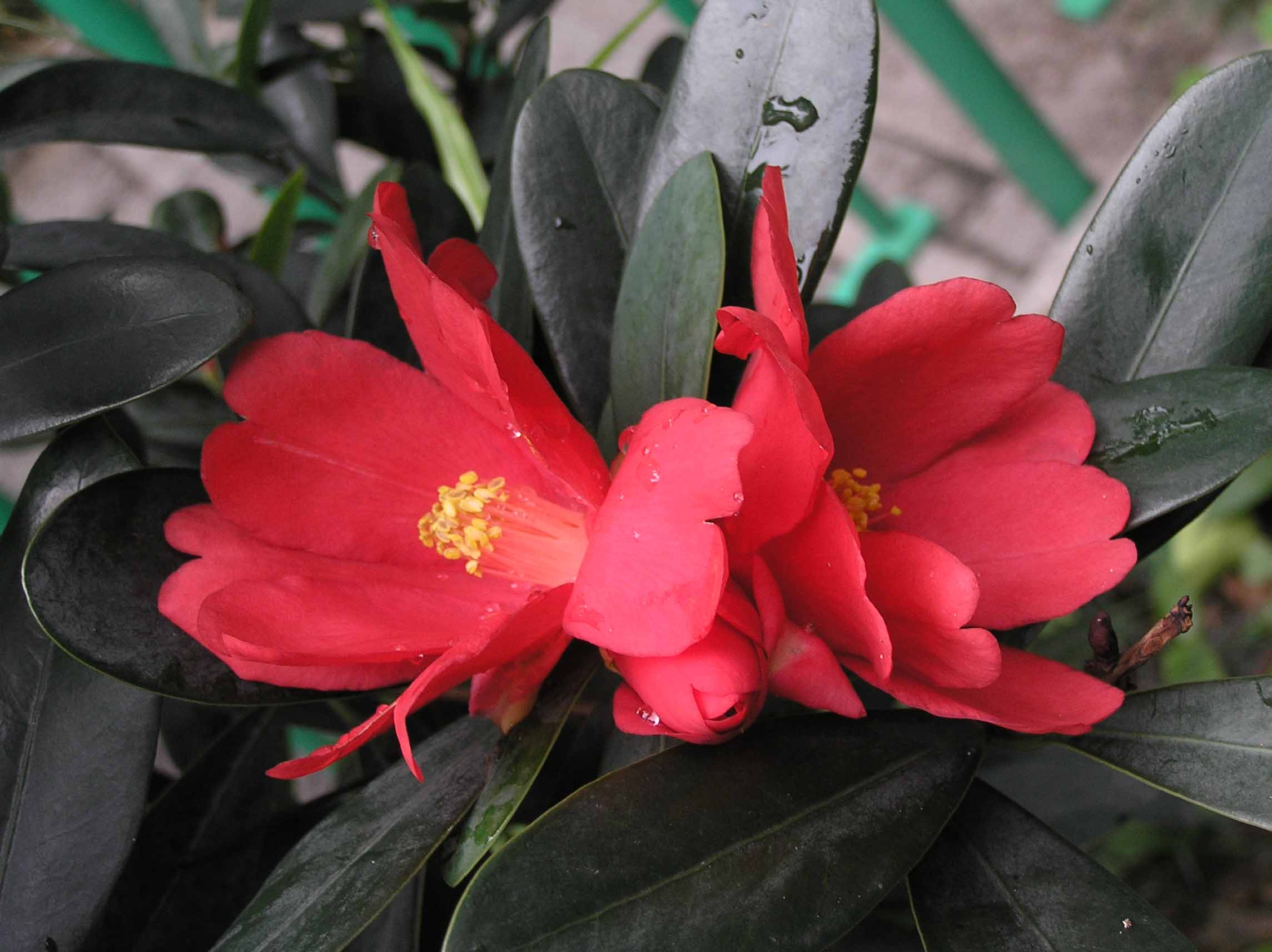
- Camellia azalea

Scientific classification
- Kingdom: Plantae
- Clade: Embryophytes
- Clade: Tracheophytes
- Clade: Spermatophytes
- Clade: Angiosperms
- Clade: Eudicots
- Clade: Asterids
- Order: Ericales
- Family: Theaceae
- Genus: Camellia
- Section: Camellia sect. Camellia autonym

Type species
- Camellia japonica L.

Synonyms
- Desmitus Raf.; Kemelia Raf.; Tsubaki Kaempf. ex Adans.; Yunnanea Hu

= Camellia sect. Camellia =

Section of Camellia

Camellia sect. Camellia is the type section of the genus Camellia and a group with high ornamental value.

== Phylogeny and evolution ==
Analyses based on genome-wide SNP data indicate that Camellia japonica and its close relative C. rusticana diverged as early as the Middle to Late Miocene, representing two independent ancient species. Populations of C. japonica can be divided into four distinct genetic lineages: North, South, Continent, and Ryukyu-Taiwan. The Continent lineage originated from a reverse colonisation event from southern Japan to the Asian continent during the Late Pleistocene glaciation. C. rusticana has long been stably distributed in the snow-rich areas along the Sea of Japan.

However, phylogenetic analyses based on chloroplast genomes show that sect. Camellia is not monophyletic; it is very closely related to sect. Oleifera. Within the section, two major clades can be recognised: one includes species distributed in southwestern China (Yunnan, Sichuan, Guizhou), while the other includes species from eastern China (Zhejiang, Jiangxi) and Japan, as well as C. oleifera. Seven highly variable hotspot regions (e.g., rps16, psaI, rpl33, and the atpH-atpI intergenic spacer) were identified as potential molecular markers.

== Morphology ==
Flowers axillary or subterminal, solitary or paired, large, subsessile. Bracteoles and sepals imbricate, caducous or sepals ± persistent after anthesis. Petals red or white, basally connate and strongly adnate to androecium. Stamens numerous; outer filament whorl connate for basal 1/2-3/4. Styles basally connate, apically 3-parted, rarely distinct (only in C. hongkongensis).

Leaf epidermal cells are polygonal or irregular in shape, with various anticlinal wall patterns. Stomata only on abaxial surface; stomatal types include cyclocytic, anisocytic, etc. Under SEM, the inner margin of the outer stomatal ledge can be nearly smooth, undulate, or dentate; wax ornamentation is striate or non-striate. Pollen grains are prolate to perprolate, tricolporate; exine ornamentation can be rugulate, rugulate‑granulate, granulate, etc.

== Distribution ==
This section is mainly distributed in China, southern Japan, and southern South Korea. In 2023, Camellia pitardii and C. mairei var. lapidea were newly recorded in northern Vietnam (Ha Giang, Lai Chau, and Lao Cai provinces), extending the distribution southward to the northern Indochinese Peninsula.

== Taxonomy ==
The infrasectional classification of sect. Camellia has long been debated. Zhang Hongda's system recognises 2 subsections and 57 species, whereas Min Tianlu's system merges them into 12 species and 6 varieties. Ni Sui (2007), integrating evidence from leaf epidermal micromorphology, pollen morphology, and nrDNA ITS sequences, proposed that sect. Camellia can be divided into 2 subsections and 4 series:

Infrasectional classification of Camellia sect. Camellia (Ni, 2007)
Subsection	Series
subsect. Reticulata	ser. Villosae
subsect. Reticulata	ser. Reticulatae
subsect. Reticulata	ser. Semiserratae
subsect. Lucidissima	ser. Pitardii

Deng et al. (2006), using RAPD markers on 29 species, supported the above subdivision, but found C. glabispetala to be genetically distant and forming a separate cluster, indicating that its taxonomic position requires further study.

== Hybridisation breeding ==
C. polyodonta is an excellent maternal parent; crossing with C. chekiangoleosa gives a fruit set rate of 52.5–64.0%, and crossing with C. semiserrata also yields high fruit set rates. Using C. polyodonta as the female parent and cultivars derived from C. japonica (e.g., 'Hongrong Beidi', 'Aniuboshi', 'Dating') as male parents, the fruit set rate reaches 30–77.78%. Recommended paternal species are C. chekiangoleosa, C. semiserrata, and C. magniflora. (Note: Now treated as a synonym of Camellia pitardii var. compressa.)

== Uses ==
Species of this section have high ornamental value in gardens. Tree shapes are diverse, including globose, conical, and horizontally spreading forms. Leaves are evergreen, leathery and glossy. Flower colour is rich, with diameters ranging from miniature to large; flowering period from February to April, making them excellent early spring woody ornamentals in southern China. Fruiting period from September to November; capsules are large, e.g., a single fruit of C. polyodonta can weigh up to 250 g.

Furthermore, the seeds of species such as C. chekiangoleosa and C. magniflora are rich in oil; the oil is clear and of high quality, suitable for use as high-grade edible oil and in cosmetics.

== Notes ==
Attribution

- This article contains text translated from the Qiuwen Baike article, which is licensed under the Creative Commons Attribution-ShareAlike 4.0 International License.
