= Vectorette PCR =

Steps in PCR

Vectorette PCR is a variation of polymerase chain reaction (PCR) designed in 1988. The original PCR was created and also patented during the 1980s. Vectorette PCR was first noted and described in an article in 1990 by John H. Riley and his team. Since then, multiple variants of PCR have been created. Vectorette PCR focuses on amplifying a specific sequence obtained from an internal sequence that is originally known until the fragment end. Multiple researches have taken this method as an opportunity to conduct experiments in order to uncover the potential uses that can be derived from Vectorette PCR.

== Introduction ==
Vectorette PCR is similar to PCR with the difference being that it is capable of obtaining the sequence desired for amplification from an already known primer site. While PCR needs information of already known sequences at both ends, Vectorette PCR only requires previous knowledge of one. This means that is able to apply the method of PCR which needs sequence information from both ends to fragments of DNA that contain the information of the sequence at only one end and not the other. In order to achieve this, there are specific steps that this method must first go through. These steps have been researched for the purpose of discovering the scientific uses of Vectorette PCR and how they can be applied.

== Steps ==
Vectorette PCR can develop a strategy to bring about PCR amplification that is unidirectional. Vectorette PCR comprises three main steps. The first step includes utilizing a restriction enzyme in order to accomplish digestion of the sample DNA. The DNA that is to be utilized for the purpose of investigation has to be capable of being digested by restriction enzymes that are appropriate for that gene otherwise the DNA fragments that form the general population cannot be created. After that is completed, a Vectorette library is brought together by ligating the Vectorette units to the appropriate DNA fragments which were previously digested. Ligation is the act of binding two things together. A Vectorette unit is only partially not completely double stranded with a mismatched section located in the center of the unit. The reason it is mismatched is to help it avoid Vectorette primers’ attempts at causing it to undergo first strand synthesis. By doing this any priming that is nonspecific is also avoided. This ligation brings together the vectorette which is double stranded and the ends of the restriction fragments which were previously made in the first step. By doing this, the known sequence which is used to prime the PCR reaction at one side is introduced while the other is primed on the genomic sequence which is already known to the user. The third and last step has two parts to it. This is due to there being two primers, the initiating primer (IP) and the Vectorette primer (VP), that act in different stages. During the first part, the IP works on amplifying the primer extension while the VP remains hybridized with the product; thus, any background amplification is not carried out at this stage. However, this changes during the last and following part of PCR as the priming that is performed comes from both the IP and the VP.

== Research ==
A lot of research has been conducted on Vectorette PCR and the applications it has in the field of biology. Scientists used Vectorette PCR to take the transgene flanking DNA and isolate it. They used this technique on the DNA belonging to mice that was next to transgene sections. From this the scientists were able to show that the use of Vectorettes is capable of facilitating the recovery and mapping of sequences in complex genomes. They have also found that Vectorette PCR can help in the analysis of sequences by subvectoretting when PCR products of a large size are the subject at hand.

Other work has looked at developing a method using Vectorette PCR in order to accomplish genomic walking. By using Vectorette PCR, scientists were able to acquire single-stranded DNA which were obtained from PCR products in order to sequence them. From this an approach was identified in which the amplification of sequences which were previously uncharacterized was possible. This research demonstrates how novel sequences can be rapidly developed when only a known sequence of DNA is used to start.

Further research has experimented with the creation of a method that progresses the isolation of microsatellite repeats. By using Vectorette PCR, researchers have found a rapid technique to accomplish this with novel, microsatellite repeats. They have attempted and succeeded in using this technique to isolate an amount of six microsatellite repeats.

Vectorette PCR has also been used to not only identify genomic positions of insertion sequences (IS) but also to map them. Research on this has shed light on a way to complete the typing of microbial stains and the identification and mapping of things like IS insertion sites that reside in microbial genomes. Vectorette PCR proves useful when it comes to rapidly and simply surveying genomes’ IS elements.

Transposable element, transposon, or TE is a variation of genetic elements that is capable of changing its location in a genome by a process called “jumping”. TE display is designed to present the different variations of TE insertion sites which helps to make numerous dominant markers. A problem that arose in the original method was finding a PCR method that was capable of being specific and efficient in its output of the transposon within the genome. Researchers have found a solution for this problem by using Vectorette PCR as the PCR method. Since Vectorette PCR is capable of being specific with its isolation and amplification of genes, this helped with their research and aided in improving the method of TE display by saving both time and costs. The researchers were then able to produce numerous dominant markers with the use of Vectorette PCR that is based on a TE display that is nonradioactive.

Thyroid lymphoma is an illness which leads to the transformation of the lymphocytes belonging to the thyroid into cells of a cancerous nature. Researchers have tested a new method that aids in the diagnosis of this condition. The use of Vectorette PCR was combined with restriction enzyme digestion, and it was found that Vectorette PCR proved to be useful in their study and aided in the diagnosis of thyroid lymphoma.

Researchers have looked into the potential use of Vectorette PCR in the examination of the genes of diseases. They have taken two methods, trinucleotide repeats which are specifically used for the targeting of transcribed regions and Vectorette PCR, to obtain simple sequence repeats or SSRs. It is believed that genetic markers can be made from these SSRs. The outcome from this research is hoped to aid researchers attempt the derivation of genetic markers which are transportable from unknown genomes. Vectorette PCR was used to uncover SSRs which flank the trinucleotide repeat that was targeted for testing. This is also known as TNR or trinucleotide Vectorette PCR. They believe that their TNR method combined with the amplification provided by Vectorette PCR can be used in eukaryotes to create molecular markers that are based on simple repeat sequences. The researchers also think that this method will be of value when attempting to isolate genes that are able to bring about diseases.

== Uses ==
The uses that have been derived from Vectorette PCR are many and have been useful to the science of biology. For example, it gives rise to methods that can help during the outbreaks of diseases by making it easier to subtype pathogens that are similar or closely related. It can also be used to help diagnose certain diseases. Earlier in this page it was noted that Vectorette PCR can give rise to multiple functions that can be performed on novel DNA sequences located near a sequence that is already known. These functions like isolating DNA, amplifying it, and analyzing it are behind the uses for Vectorette PCR. These uses are things like genome walking, DNA sequencing for the termini of Yeast Artificial Chromosomes (YAC) and cosmid inserts, being able to map introns and promoters in genomic DNA and regions with mutations, facilitating the sequencing of clones of a large size, and filling in the gaps that arise during the mapping of genomes.

An intron is a DNA sequence that is flanked by exons and therefore located in between them. It is the region that gets cut out while exons are expressed, and so introns do not affect the code of amino acids. Gene expression can be affected by only a number of intronic sequences. Vectorette PCR has been found to be beneficial when it comes to the characterization of these intronic sequences when they are found to be next to known sequences.

cDNA or complementary DNA is a DNA sequence which is complementary to the RNA that is the template when synthesizing DNA during the reverse transcriptase process. Vectorette PCR that utilizes the primers that originate from cDNA gives rise to a method that is capable of acquiring intron sequences which are located adjacent to exons and aiding in the development of the structure of genes. It is able to achieve this when initializing the process with a sequence of cDNA and a clone of a genome.

Vectorette PCR also gives the user an advantage than if he/she were using other existing technologies. The user will be able to carry out tasks like gene manipulation that is cell-free, Vectorette PCR with minimal material to start with, and performing Vectorette PCR with DNA that needs not be of high purity. These advantages allow the user to save time and resources while increasing the range of DNA that can be targeted.

=== Chromosome Walking ===
Chromosome walking can be used for the purpose of cloning a gene. It does this by using the known gene’s markers that are closest and can therefore be used in techniques like isolating DNA sequences and aiding in the sequencing and cloning of the DNA of organisms. Chromosome walking is also useful when it comes to filling in the gaps that may be present in genomes by locating clones that overlap with a library clone end. This means that for chromosome walking to be carried out, it requires a clone library of a genomic format. This is why Vectorette PCR is one of the methods that can be used to create this library for chromosome walking to occur. Vectorette PCR comes in handy when it is necessary to obtain the regions that are both upstream and downstream and flank a sequence that is already known. By obtaining these regions, it provides the library of a genomic format that chromosome walking requires.

=== Yeast Artificial Chromosome ===
Yeast artificial chromosome or YAC is a DNA molecule that is developed by humans to take the DNA sequences that belong to yeast cells and clone them. Yeast artificial chromosomes can be inserted with fragments of DNA from the organism of interest. Yeast cells will then assimilate the yeast artificial chromosome that contains the DNA from the organism of interest. The yeast cells then multiply in number and this brings about the amplification of the DNA that has been incorporated into it which is then isolated for the purpose of things like sequencing and mapping of the DNA desired i.e. the DNA originally inserted into the yeast artificial chromosome. Vectorette PCR helps with this process by bringing about not only the isolation of the yeast artificial chromosome’s ends but also the amplification of the ends.
