= Bulked segregant analysis =

Identification of genetic markers through phenotype-based analysis

Bulked segregant analysis (BSA) is a technique used to identify genetic markers associated with a mutant phenotype. This allows geneticists to discover genes conferring certain traits of interest, such as disease resistance or susceptibility.

This technique involves forming two groups that display opposing phenotypes for a trait of interest. For example, the individuals in one group are resistant to a disease, whereas those in the second group are not. Two bulked DNA samples are then created by pooling the DNA of all individuals in each group.

These two bulked samples can then be analysed using techniques such as Restriction fragment length polymorphism or RAPD to detect similarities and differences in the various loci of the genome. The two groups will have a random distribution of alleles in all loci of the genome except for loci that are associated with the mutation. A consistent difference on a locus between the two bulked samples likely means that the locus is associated with the mutation of interest.

== Generation of testing groups ==
In animals, the individuals making up the two testing groups are usually produced by a cross between two siblings heterozygous for the mutation of interest. The use of siblings is necessary to ensure that the alleles contributing to the mutation are the same among the individuals.

There must be a minimum amount of heterozygosity in the various loci of the groups to allow the genes that are associated with the trait of interest to be identified. Since most laboratory strains are inbred, outcrossing of the homozygous mutated individual with a polymorphic strain is essential to generate effective testing groups. The offspring are crossed with each other to generate testing groups.

== Analysis techniques ==
Bulked DNA samples can be analysed using Southern blotting. Use of restriction enzymes or PCR amplification on the DNA is required for RFLP or RAPD analysis respectively. In these techniques, the loci that are analysed are the restriction digest sites and the sequences on which PCR primers attach to. These sites are usually located throughout the genome. Once linked loci are detected, they can be mapped and the linkage distances between them determined.
