= Diversity arrays technology =

Molecular biology technique

Diversity Arrays Technology (DArT) is a high-throughput genetic marker technique that can detect allelic variations to provide comprehensive genome coverage without any DNA sequence information for genotyping and other genetic analysis. The general steps involve reducing the complexity of the genomic DNA with specific restriction enzymes, choosing diverse fragments to serve as representations for the parent genomes, amplify via polymerase chain reaction (PCR), inserting fragments into a vector to be placed as probes within a microarray, and then fluorescent targets from a reference sequence will be allowed to hybridize with probes and put through an imaging system. The objective is to identify and quantify various forms of DNA polymorphism within genomic DNA of sampled species.

First reported in 2001 by Damian Jaccoud, Andrzej Kilian, David Feinstein, and Kaiman Peng, DArT prioritized significant advantages over other traditional primer-based methods like the ability to analyze large amounts of various samples from a low amount of initial DNA. It also afforded low costs and faster results compared to related solid state DNA arrays that detected Single Nucleotide Polymorphisms (SNPs). Since its inception, the technology has been a major instrument in the analysis of polyploid plants as well as in the construction of physical and genetic maps to understand relations between species based on similarities and allelic variances among their genomes.

== History ==
The concept was first developed by Damian Jaccoud, Andrzej Kilian, David Feinstein, and Kaiman Peng in 2001. They aimed to establish a genomic DNA-polymorphism detection and quantification technique that would increase throughput when compared to more traditional methods like Amplified Fragment Length Polymorphism (AFLP), Restriction Fragment Length Polymorphism (RFLP), Simple Sequence Repeats (SSR). They also aimed to minimize cost and reliance on sequenced genomes to identify polymorphisms which is a consequence of early immobilized, solid-states DNA arrays, like DNA chips, which solely identify SNPs. A byproduct of their discovery of a fast, low-cost whole-genome profiling method was that it also provided with the identification of SNPs as well as base-pair insertions, deletions, and shifts, which is an added layer of allelic variation between species analyzed.

Jaccoud, Kilian, Feinstein, and Peng selected nine subspecies of rice as their source for genomic DNA and polymorphism analysis. The analysis consisted of detecting the presence, or absence, of specific DNA polymorphisms with probing arrays as well as quantifying the strength of each signal, via fluorescence, within the subspecies. Upon selecting and extracting DNA samples from subjects, samples were digested with three specific restriction enzymes and ligated with T4 ligase. Following ligation into double stranded DNA, dilution as well as extraction of a short amount of mixture to use as a PCR template was performed. Products were placed into a pCR2.1-TOPO vector and subsequently transformed into E. coli, who were selected based on resistance to ampicillin and pigmentation from the X-gal interaction. Cloned cells are amplified with PCR-amplified, purified, and introduced into a microarray. Reference DNA and samples were mixed with fluorescent dyes, Cy3 or Cy5, mixed, denatured, and allowed to hybridize to further reintroduce them into the microarray for further analysis. Results reported that the use of DArT was able to detect the presence or absence of polymorphism in an expedient manner as compared to RFLP as well as quantify the polymorphisms detected. In addition, DArT was able to minimize the amount of initial DNA required to conduct the analysis significantly compared to other methods.

== Procedure ==
The DArT is broken down into three essential steps: Complexity reduction, genomic representation, and DArT assay.

=== Complexity reduction ===
This step of the process deals with reducing large complex genomic DNA of selected species into more, manageable fragmented components through the use of specific restriction enzymes. In addition, this step exclusively relies on digestion enzymes over a couple effort of digestion enzymes and primers due to the reported increased polymorphism identified across analyzed samples. The PstI enzyme is a commonly used restriction enzyme for this step because of its specificity to the nonrepetitive, nonmethylated genome of species.

=== Genomic representation ===
Once genomic DNA has been reduced to a manageable size from the previous step by incorporating one or two specific restriction enzymes, the next step involves selecting for the fragments that include largest amount of significant polymorphism across gene pool. These selected fragments are termed “representations” as they are smaller representations of the initial, larger genomic DNA. It is eminent to avoid repetitive sequences when selecting fragments as these will exhibit the lowest amount of polymorphism within analyzed genomic DNA.

=== DArT assay ===
Digested sequences are ligated using T4 ligase to produce double stranded DNA. A small amount of ligated mixture will be diluted then amplified via PCR. During PCR, it is important to use primers complementary to the restriction-enzymes’ cutting sites and RedTaq polymerase, which is rarely inhibited. Mix product into an amplified, gene pool representation and ligate onto vector pCR2.1-TOPO. Following representation insertion into vector, transform vector into E. coli cells via electrical shocking or chemical means. Incubate cells and select based on ampicillin resistance and white-pigmentation from inactive β-galactosidase gene in a medium containing X-gal. Inserts are then amplified via PCR and inserted as spotters into a microarray slide. Slides are centrifuge to isolate inserts, which are then purified.

Fluorescent dyes, Cy3 or Cy5, are added to the microarray targets, which are genomic representations. Following addition of the fluorescent dye, targets are added to microarray probes containing the amplified E. coli clones where denaturing and subsequent hybridization, if possible, takes place. Following hybridization, slides are washed and scanned with an imaging system that targets fluorescent signals with the incorporation of an open-source software called DArTsoft. Interactions and dissimilarities between probe and various targets are used to develop a histogram which quantifies and identifies several forms of DNA polymorphism among analyzed genomes.

== Applications ==
=== Molecular breeding ===
The ability to identify and quantify allelic variations among genomes without the need for a sequenced genome is of great value to DArT and has large implications in the molecular breeding sector. By comparing crops with phenotypes such as higher yields of produce or resistance to certain environmental parasites, a phenotype can be directly linked to a DNA polymorphism identified among related species through DArT. DArT is also able to outperform other genotyping techniques with polyploids due to the absence of primer competition found in other techniques. Polyploids are commonly found among agriculturally important crops. For example, DArT has been used to conduct genome-wide analysis among Musa species, which includes bananas and plantains, which led to the development of a phylogenetic cladogram based on genetic markers derived from DArT techniques. These developments enhance breeding knowledge to obtain desirable yields and products.

Expedited recognition of markers found with genes responsible for phenotypes is also being studied in animals with the help of DArT. Mosquitoes’ resistance to insecticide has been linked to specific mutations in genes that confer resistance to certain species of mosquitoes over others. Genotypic variations were found through markers while conducting DArT analysis on relevant samples.

=== Genomic mapping ===
Since DArT is able to find genetic relations among species within a metagenome in a cheap and expedited manner, it has been integral to developing physical and genetic maps of closely related species. In its inception, DArT was used to develop phylogenetic cladograms of rice subspecies based on the presence or absence of DNA fragments in each species’ genome. In the same manner, DArT was incorporated in fabricating genetic maps for A. thaliana by conducting an automated version of DArT. Wheat, a hexaploid, is also another crop that has benefited from implementation of a DArT analysis as a Bacterial Artificial Chromosome (BAC) of the largest chromosome, 3B, was created from markers detected through DArT assays.
