= Mendelian error =

Error in the mendelian inheritance

A Mendelian error in the genetic analysis of a species, describes an allele in an individual which could not have been received from either of its biological parents by Mendelian inheritance. Inheritance is defined by a set of related individuals who have the same or similar phenotypes for a locus of a particular gene. A Mendelian error means that the very structure of the inheritance as defined by analysis of the parental genes is incorrect: one parent of one individual is not actually the parent indicated; therefore the assumption is that the parental information is incorrect.

Possible explanations for Mendelian errors are genotyping errors, erroneous assignment of the individuals as relatives, chimerism, or de novo mutations. Mendelian error is established by demonstrating the existence of a trait which is inconsistent with every possible combination of genotype compatible with the individual. This method of determination requires pedigree checking, however, and establishing a contradiction between phenotype and pedigree is an NP-complete problem. Genetic inconsistencies which do not correspond to this definition are Non-Mendelian Errors.

Statistical genetics analysis is used to detect these errors and to detect the possibility of the individual being linked to a specific disease linked to a single gene. Examples of such diseases in humans caused by single genes are Huntington's disease or Marfan syndrome.

== See also ==
- Gregor Mendel
- SNP genotyping

== Footnotes ==
- Mendelian error detection in complex pedigree using weighted constraint satisfaction techniques
