= DNA amplification fingerprinting =

DNA profiling technique

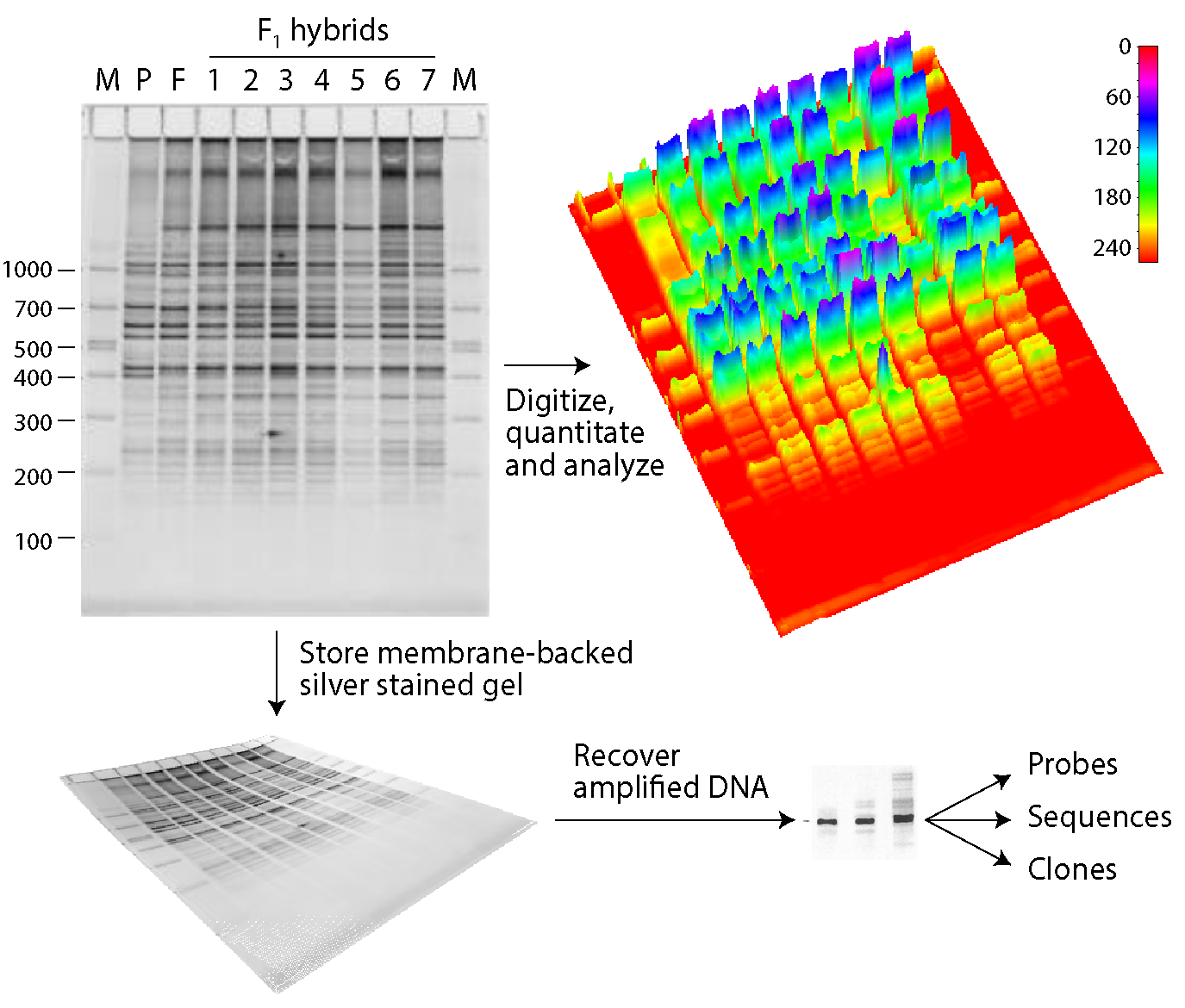
DAF profiles of flowering dogwood (Cornus florida L.) cultivars Pink Sachet and Fragrant Cloud, and their F1 hybrids, originally generated using a Taguchi-optimized protocol, were digitized and quantified using ImageJ. The source material was a polyester membrane-backed, silver stained polyacrylamide gel produced in 1997. Remarkably, arbitrarily amplified DNA was successfully recovered and re-amplified nearly 30 years later.

DNA amplification fingerprinting (DAF) is a highly sensitive DNA profiling technique that generates complex, reproducible genomic fingerprints without prior knowledge of sequence information. Developed in the very early 1990s by Gustavo Caetano-Anollés and colleagues at the University of Tennessee, DAF offered a high-resolution alternative to nucleic acid scanning methods such as random amplified polymorphic DNA (RAPD), arbitrarily primed PCR (AP-PCR), and amplified fragment length polymorphism (AFLP) for genetic typing, strain discrimination, genome mapping, and population analysis.

DAF employs single, very short arbitrary oligonucleotide primers, typically 5-8 nucleotides (nt) in length, and a polymerase chain reaction (PCR) to amplify multiple anonymous regions dispersed throughout the genome. Because the primers are extremely short, they anneal at numerous partially complementary sites. When two sites occur in opposite orientation and within amplifiable distance (generally < 3–5 kb), the intervening segment is amplified. Resolution of the resulting products by high-resolution denaturing or native polyacrylamide gel electrophoresis (PAGE), followed by silver staining, produces dozens to hundreds of bands that together form a characteristic genomic "fingerprint," with individual bands often serving as genetic markers.

DAF is distinguished from related arbitrarily amplified DNA techniques by its high primer-to-template ratios, procedural simplicity, strong reproducibility, and high multiplex capacity. In addition to whole genomes, fingerprints can be generated from subgenomic fragments such as PCR amplified products, cloned DNA, and complementary DNA (cDNA) populations.

== Mechanism ==
DAF relies on a thermostable DNA polymerase (e.g. Taq polymerase or truncated versions of the enzyme such as the Stoffel fragment) operating under low annealing stringency to achieve primer-directed amplification of genomic DNA. The enzyme amplifies genomic segments located between inversely oriented primer binding sites. Initial amplicons arising from anonymous regions between these sites become "preferential templates" in subsequent cycles because they carry perfect primer complements at their termini. As a result, extension products from one cycle serve as optimal templates for further priming and synthesis in the next, leading to exponential enrichment of these fragments. The outcome is a complex mixture of DNA fragments of varying sizes and abundances that reflect the genomic distribution of short primer-matching motifs, distances between them, sequence polymorphisms that create or abolish priming sites, and insertion/deletions (indels) that alter fragment length. In this way, DAF reveals polymorphism without targeting specific loci.

A mechanistic model for DNA amplification with arbitrary primers was proposed by Caetano-Anollés et al. (but also see). The model emphasizes the competitive interplay between primer–template and template–template interactions established primarily during the first few PCR amplification cycles. During this initial template-screening phase, a subset of genomic regions is preferentially recruited into amplification through primer–template–enzyme interactions that tolerate substantial mismatch, enabling very short arbitrary primers to anneal at multiple sites. Once extension occurs, first-round amplification products are single-stranded molecules that often contain inverted complementary sequences at their termini. These sequences promote intramolecular base pairing (hairpin loop formation) and intermolecular duplex formation through template–template annealing, introducing competing structural conformations in subsequent cycles. Primers must then recognize, invade, and displace these structures to permit polymerase binding and extension. Consequently, only early amplicons whose conformations allow efficient primer access continue to amplify efficiently. Finally, as amplification proceeds, the reaction approaches a dynamic equilibrium among competing single strands, hairpins, duplexes, primer–template complexes, and enzyme-bound intermediates. Within this mixture, the relatively rare but productive primer–template duplexes are continuously converted into accumulating products, yielding the complex yet reproducible banding patterns characteristic of DAF.

This model explains why genome-scanning techniques amplify a defined, reproducible subset genomic fragments rather than sampling the genome at random, with outcomes largely determined by events in the earliest PCR cycles.

== Primer design and amplification conditions ==
Primers are arbitrarily selected and used at high concentrations (3-30 μM) compared with those typical of AP-PCR (1-10 μM) and RAPD (0.3 μM). Their sequences are not designed to target any specific known gene or genomic region. Primer lengths approach the minimum configuration capable of supporting DNA amplification. Successful amplification requires primers at least 5 nt, but preferably 8 nt in length, with annealing dependent on perfect homology to the first 5-6 nt from the 3' terminus. The short primer length promotes mismatch-tolerant priming, resulting in the amplification of dozens to hundreds of fragments of varying size.

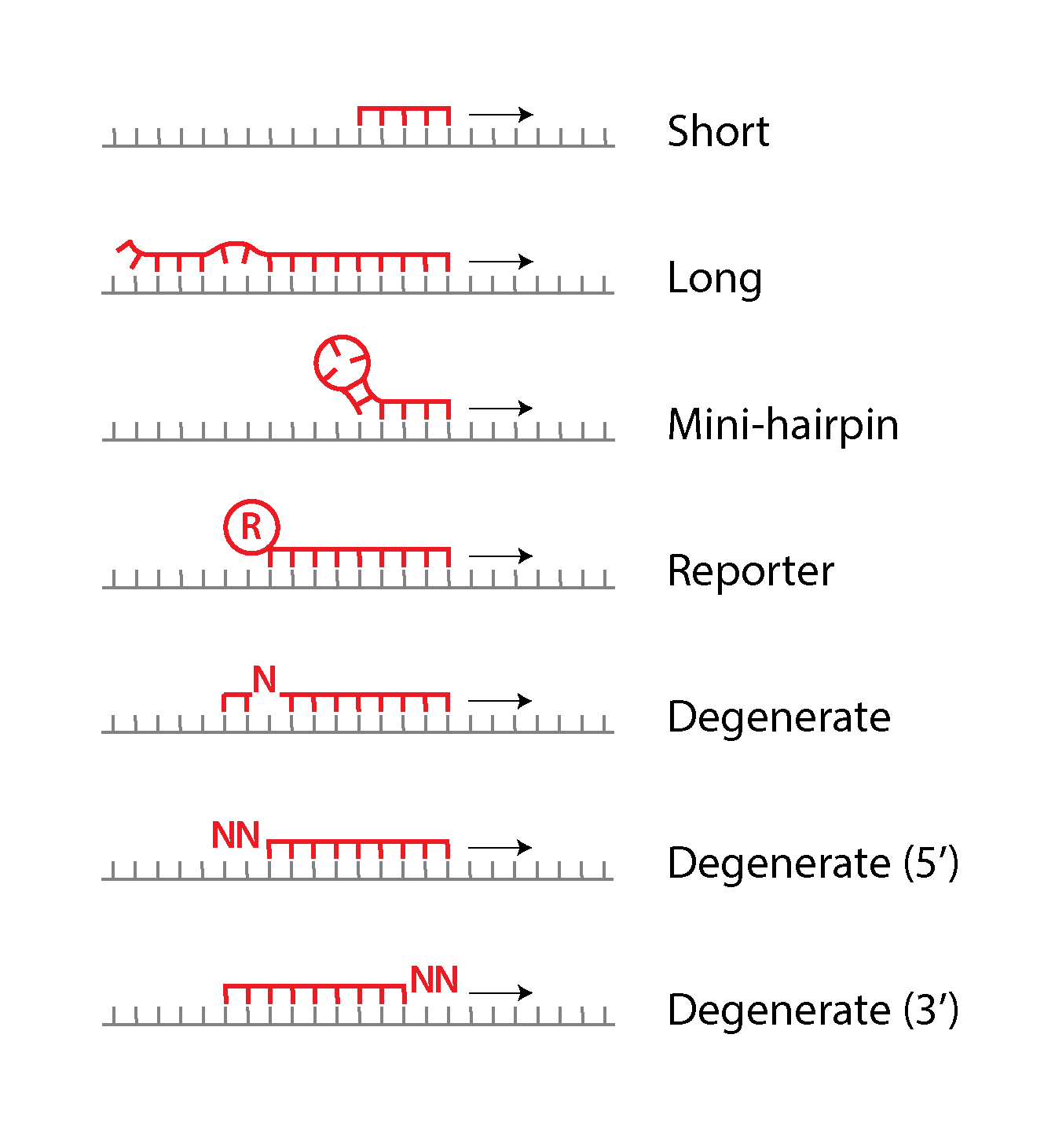
Oligonucleotide primers used in DAF. The direction of primer extension by DNA polymerase is indicated with an arrow. R, reporter group; N, degenerate nucleotide base.

Primers can be screened by their ability to detect polymorphisms. For example, in studies of genetic diversity in white lupin (Lupinus albus), 56 octamer primers were evaluated, of which 22 produced highly polymorphic DAF patterns useful for distinguishing accessions. Primers can also be chosen to modulate DNA profile complexity. Very short primers (5-6 nt in length) tend to produce simple banding patterns resembling those of RAPD, whereas longer primers (≥ 20 nt) can be used reproducibly but often yield less complex profiles. Primers engineered to contain an extraordinarily stable mini-hairpin at the 5' terminus allow reduction of the arbitrary 3' sequence to as few as 3 nt, enabling controlled amplification of low-complexity templates such as plasmids and PCR fragments while increasing detection of polymorphic DNA. Incorporation of reporter groups (e.g., fluorophores or biotin) at the 5' terminus or the use of degenerate bases within the primer sequence, can further tailor DNA profile complexity and facilitate variant fingerprinting. Substitutions with inosine generally simplifies patternsm whereas substitutions with any of the four possible nucleotides increases profile complexity.

Reactions are optimized for high stringency but still permissive enough for multiple priming events. Because many interacting variables affect amplification efficiency and banding patterns, optimization is labor-intensive and typically relies on iterative or statistically designed experiments (e.g., matrix analysis, fractional factorial designs, or Taguchi experimental design methods) rather than exhaustive testing. A central determinant of DAF performance is the very high primer-to-template ratio, with primer concentration, template quantity, and DNA quality all influencing reproducibility. Choice of thermostable DNA polymerase is critical, as different enzymes produce markedly different fingerprints. Truncated enzymes such as the Stoffel fragment are preferred for their stability and tolerance to variable magnesium levels. Ionic components, especially magnesium and its interaction with primers, dNTPs, and buffer ions, strongly modulate amplification stringency, making universal buffer formulations impractical across enzymes. Thermal cycling parameters—particularly annealing temperature and denaturation time—shape product yield and distribution, though many parameters have wide tolerances once set within appropriate ranges.

== DNA separation, preservation and visualization ==
DNA profiles are typically resolved by PAGE and silver staining, but can also be generated using agarose gel electrophoresis, denaturing gradient gel electrophoresis (DGGE), temperature sweep gel electrophoresis (TSGE), or automated platforms such as DNA sequencers or capillary electrophoresis (CE). Amplification products may be visualized by silver staining, fluorescent intercalating dyes (e.g. ethidium bromide), or radioactive labeling. Polyester-backed, silver stained polyacrylamide gels can be preserved for decades, often stored in photographic albums. These gels permit straightforward densitometric scanning of DNA profiles and serve both as experimental records and as physical repositories of amplified DNA. The silver stained amplification products can be isolated from the dried gels, re-amplified, cloned and sequenced.

== DAF variants ==
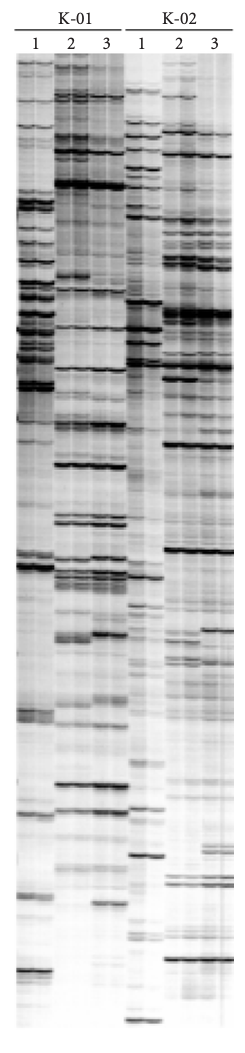
RAF profiles amplified from tomato (lanes 1), Glycine soja (lanes 2), and Glycine max (lanes 3) using two distinct decamer primers.

DAF variants include mini-hairpin DAF (mhpDAF), arbitrary signatures from amplification profiles (ASAP), and template endonuclease cleaved multiple arbitrary amplicon profiling (tecMAAP). mhpDAF substantially increases the detection of polymorphic DNA during fingerprinting by probing a larger effective portion of the genome through extended and structure-influenced annealing interactions. This expanded scanning capacity can dramatically improve resolution (up to 5-fold ) by preferentially selecting amplicons with extended annealing sites during secondary amplification. ASAP re-amplifies DAF (or other PCR) products using mini-hairpin primers. This two-step strategy allows combinatorial primer use, so that different primer pairs produce distinct fingerprints, greatly expanding discriminatory power, especially when multiplexed. tecMAAP enhances polymorphism detection (up to 100-fold) by digesting template DNA with restriction endonucleases before DAF. Restriction reduces template length, alters primer–template kinetics, and eliminates or creates preferential amplicons depending on sequence variation at restriction sites, thereby increasing sequence discrimination of very closely related genotypes. DAF variants also encompass modifications in the post-amplification resolution of amplification products. For example, Randomly amplified DNA fingerprinting (RAF) enhances profile resolution by labeling amplicons with radioactive ^{33}P or fluorescence and resolving them on large polyacrylamide sequencing gels. This format yields highly reproducible banding patterns, generates measurable fraction of co-dominant markers, and compares favorably with amplified fragment length polymorphism (AFLP) in both analytical efficiency and reliability.

== Applications ==
DAF and its variants have been used for strain, species and cell line identification, population genetics and phylogeography, linkage mapping and marker discovery, assessment of genomic diversity, microbial typing and epidemiology, and discrimination of plant and fungal cultivars. Examples include fingerprinting of bacteria (e.g., Acinetobacter baumanii isolates from intensive care unit patients, mixed bacterial populations in culture bioreactors), population analysis of downy mildew-causing fungi (Pseudoperonospora humuli), development of sequence characterized amplified region (SCAR) markers and DAF of coelomycete fungi (Boeremia exigua), analysis of dogwood anthracnose-causing Discula destructiva fungi, population analysis of fairy ring fungi (Marasmius oreades), identification of insect and human cell lines, genetic diversity analysis of sweet potato (Ipomoeba batatas), yam (Dioscorea sp.), and the pantropical genus Vigna, and genetic mapping and bulked segregant analysis in pea, soybean, and chickpea.

DAF is an early high-resolution fingerprinting technique, particularly valued from the 1990s to the late 2000s for rapid genetic typing in microbes, plants, and other organisms. The advent of next-generation sequencing (NGS) workflows for whole-genome analysis and for targeted discovery of microsatellites, single nucleotide polymorphisms, an other specific genomic regions, including restriction site associated DNA (RAD) markers, promise to displace the simpler genome-scanning methods, including DAF, RAPD, AP-PCR, and AFLP, and their variants. However, DAF remains valuable for low-cost, rapid genomic fingerprinting, retrospective analysis of archived profiles, recovery of anonymous amplicons for sequencing, and exploratory surveys of genomic variation where high-throughput approaches are impractical (see arbitrarily amplified DNA).

== Advantages and limitations ==
DAF requires no prior knowledge of DNA sequence, allowing its application to virtually any organism or engineered construct. The method is fast, reproducible and technically simple (typically, 3-10 h, depending on the thermal cycler), provides high-resolution and reproducibility, permits long-term preservation of DNA fingerprints, and is particularly useful for distinguishing closely related organisms where other methods reveal little variation. These properties separate DAF from the notoriously laboratory-dependent RAPD. However, DAF requires careful optimization of reaction conditions and typically generates dominant markers, which makes discrimination of heterozygotes difficult. However, DAF products can be recovered from polyacrylamide or agarose gels, cloned and converted into co-dominant SCAR markers, allowing distinction between heterozygous and homozygous individuals.

== See also ==
- Arbitrarily amplified DNA
- Random amplification of polymorphic DNA
- Arbitrarily primed PCR
- Amplified fragment length polymorphism
