= Sequence-tagged site =

A sequence-tagged site (or STS) is a short (200 to 500 base pair) DNA sequence that has a single occurrence in the genome and whose location and base sequence are known.

== Usage ==
STSs can be easily detected by the polymerase chain reaction (PCR) using specific primers. For this reason they are useful for constructing genetic and physical maps from sequence data reported from many different laboratories. They serve as landmarks on the developing physical map of a genome.

When STS loci contain genetic polymorphisms (e.g. simple sequence length polymorphisms, SSLPs, single nucleotide polymorphisms), they become valuable genetic markers, i.e. loci which can be used to distinguish individuals.

They are used in shotgun sequencing, specifically to aid sequence assembly.

STSs are very helpful for detecting microdeletions in some genes. For example, some STSs can be used in screening by PCR to detect microdeletions in Azoospermia (AZF) genes in infertile men.

== See also ==
- Simple sequence length polymorphism
