= Simple sequence length polymorphism =

Type of DNA polymorphism used as genetic markers

Simple Sequence Length Polymorphisms (SSLPs) are used as genetic markers with polymerase chain reaction (PCR). An SSLP is a type of polymorphism: a difference in DNA sequence amongst individuals. SSLPs are repeated sequences over varying base lengths in intergenic regions of deoxyribonucleic acid (DNA). Variance in the length of SSLPs can be used to understand genetic variation between two individuals in a certain species.

== Applications ==
An example of the usage of SSLPs (microsatellites) is seen in a study by Rosenberg et al., where SSLPs were used to cluster different continental populations of human beings. The study was critical to Nicholas Wade's New York Times Bestseller, Before the Dawn: Recovering the Lost History of Our Ancestors.

== Rosenberg Study ==
Rosenberg studied 377 SSLPs in 1000 people in 52 different regions of the world. By using PCR and cluster analysis, Rosenberg was able to group individuals that had the same SSLPs . These SSLPs were extremely useful to the experiment because they do not affect the phenotypes of the individuals, thus being unaffected by natural selection.
