= Arbitrarily amplified DNA =

Arbitrarily amplified DNA (AAD) refers to a family of DNA profiling methods that amplify template nucleic acids with arbitrary oligonucleotide primers using the polymerase chain reaction (PCR). AAD includes the first methodologies introduced in the very early 1990s within a span of only few months: random amplified polymorphic DNA (RAPD), arbitrarily primed PCR (AP-PCR), and DNA amplification fingerprinting (DAF). These techniques were initially used for genetic typing, strain discrimination, genome mapping, phylogenetic analysis, and population analysis, in that sequence, and their subsequent use over the following decades continues to influence many areas of research. Several variants were introduced in the first years after their development (see early listings), one of which–amplified fragment length polymorphism (AFLP)–became widely adopted.

== Comparing main AAD profiling methods ==
Operationally, DAF, AP-PCR and RAPD can be distinguished by the length of the arbitrary primers and the primer-to-template DNA ratios used during amplification. DAF employs the shortest primers and the highest primer-to-template ratios. RAPD uses intermediate primer lengths and the lowest primer-to-template ratios. AP-PCR uses the longest primers and intermediate ratios. These amplification conditions lead DAF and AP-PCR to produce more complex fingerprinting patterns than RAPD, which necessitates high-resolution separation by denaturing or native polyacrylamide gel electrophoresis (PAGE) followed by silver staining or radiolabeling.

DAF and AP-PCR have proven to be highly reproducible when amplification conditions are properly controlled, whereas RAPD is widely regarded as less reproducible. RAPD relies on short primers and low primer concentrations under low-stringency conditions, making amplification highly sensitive to small variations in reaction composition, DNA quality, and thermal cycling parameters. As a result, RAPD profiles are more prone to variability between laboratories and even between runs within the same laboratory. These differences in reproducibility were a major factor leading to the preference for DAF and AP-PCR in applications requiring high-resolution and consistent DNA fingerprinting.

Comparing DAF, AP-PCR and RAPD DNA profiling techniqes
Characteristics	DAF	AP-PCR	RAPD
DNA amplification
Primer length (nt)	5–15	18–32	9–10
Primer concentration (µM)	3–30	1–10	0.3
DNA concentration (ng/µl)	0.01–1	0.1–5	1
Primer/template DNA ratio	5–50,000	1–500	<1
Annealing temperature (°C)^{2}	10–65	35–50	35–42
Amplification stringency	low to high	high and low	low
DNA separation
Visualization	PAGE	PAGE	agarose
Product resolution	silver staining	radiolabeling	EtBr staining
Number of products (N_{obs})	high	intermediate	low
Typical range	10–100	3–50	1–10
Average of products^{3} in bacteria	75 (0.003–2.3)	–	7.7 (0.1–35)
Average of products in fungi	59 (0.09–35)	–	7.1 (0.02–0.2)
Average of products in plants	79 (35–179)	–	7.0 (0.1–6)
Average of products in animals	83 (52–139)	–	7.2 (2–5)
Detection of polymorphic DNA
Polymorphisms per primer/RFLP per locus^{4}	3–5	1–2	1
Polymorphism abundance^{5}	1.1	0.7	1
Non-functional primers (%)	5–10	30	20–50
^{1} Abbreviations: PAGE, polyacrylamide gel electrophoresis; RFLP, restriction fragment length polymorphism.^{2} During first-round amplification cycles, or during the overall amplification reaction.^{3} The average number of observed amplification products was normalized to the average range of 0.3–3 kb. Expected number of amplification products is given in parentheses.^{4} Estimate of discriminative ability (i.e. polymorphic DNA) relative to RFLP analysis.^{5} Estimate relative to RAPD analysis, based on fractional polymorphic content in soybean, sugarcane and turfgrasses.

== Nomenclature ==
Across the early literature (1990–1995), the collective family of methods that includes RAPD, DAF, and AP-PCR was described using several overlapping umbrella terms before nomenclature stabilized. In the earliest reports, the terms RAPD and AP-PCR terms were often used loosely to describe the entire approach. Recognition that these methods differed operationally led to the introduction of comparative descriptors, including multiple arbitrary amplicon profiling (MAAP)(emphasizing profiling of many amplicons), arbitrarily amplified DNA (emphasizing arbitrary primers as defining features), nucleic acid scanning (emphasizing the genome survey function), and arbitrarily primed PCR (emphasizing the PCR mechanism). By the mid-1990s, AAD had emerged as the most technically correct (encyclopedic) umbrella term for the family, although some later literature continued to group these approaches under RAPD-affiliated methods. Note that the term RAPD is somewhat misleading, as the primers and amplification process are arbitrary rather than random.

== AAD extensions ==
Several AAD variants enhance the genome-scanning capacity of traditional methods. Mini-hairpin DAF (mhpDAF) increases coverage and resolution by favoring extended, structure-influenced annealing during secondary amplification. Arbitrary signatures from amplification profiles (ASAP) employs two-step re-amplification with mini-hairpin primers, allowing combinatorial primer use to produce highly discriminative fingerprints. Template endonuclease–cleaved multiple arbitrary amplicon profiling (tecMAAP) further improves resolution by digesting template DNA with restriction enzymes before amplification, altering primer–template kinetics and selectively amplifying variable sites to enhance discrimination among closely related genotypes. Similarly, the widely used amplified fragment length polymorphism (AFLP) method samples multiple genomic loci without prior sequence information, but it does so by digesting DNA with restriction enzymes, ligating adapters, and selectively amplifying subsets of fragments. These approaches produce highly reproducible multilocus fingerprints that are less sensitive to PCR conditions, enabling robust analyses of genetic diversity, population structure, and phylogeography. The popular AFLP, in particular, retains the advantages of anonymous genome-wide sampling while bridging the methodological gap between low-cost RAPD markers and high-throughput sequencing approaches.

== The AAD logic re-emerges in reduced-representation sequencing methodologies ==
Reduced-representation sequencing methods such as restriction site associated DNA sequencing (RAD-seq) are high-throughput DNA profiling approaches that enable genome-wide marker discovery and genotyping for applications including association mapping, QTL analysis, population genetics, ecological genomics, and evolutionary biology. RAD-seq, originally formalized by Baird et al., targets a reproducible subset of the genome by digesting genomic DNA with restriction enzymes, ligating sequencing adapters (often incorporating sample-specific barcodes), performing size selection, and sequencing the resulting fragments on high-throughput platforms such as Illumina systems. Genetic variation is then characterized primarily through single-nucleotide polymorphism (SNP) discovery and genotyping at loci adjacent to restriction sites.

Although modern reduced-representation sequencing methods are technologically distinct, they revive the underlying logic of AAD: genome complexity reduction followed by anonymous multilocus sampling without prior sequence knowledge and extraction of comparative genetic information. AAD achieves this through low-stringency amplification with arbitrary primers, generating information-rich multilocus fragment profiles (particularly in DAF and AFLP) typically via low-stringency priming. RAD-seq instead reduces complexity via restriction enzyme digestion, selectively sequencing fragments adjacent to cut sites and identifying thousands to millions of SNPs across distributed loci. The distinction is therefore technological rather than conceptual: whereas AAD infers variation from fragment size polymorphisms, RAD-seq resolves genetic variation directly at the nucleotide level.

Remarkably, comparative analyses of AAD and RAD-seq markers show that AAD techniques can robustly delimit evolutionary relationships in both plants and animals, often yielding conclusions congruent with those obtained from RAD-seq datasets. When the primary objective is the delimitation of evolutionary entities—a central goal in biodiversity research, systematics, and conservation genetics—AAD approaches remain methodologically adequate while avoiding the substantial financial and infrastructural demands associated with high-throughput sequencing. Thus, the choice between AAD and RAD-seq is not solely a matter of inferential power, but also of practical feasibility.

This distinction has important global implications. Many of the world's economically disadvantaged countries harbor a disproportionate share of global biodiversity yet remain underrepresented in genomic research due to chronic underfunding and limited access to sequencing infrastructure. Publication patterns show that funding for RAD-seq and AFLP research is concentrated in economically affluent nations, highlighting the value of lower-cost AAD methods such as DAF, which are more accessible in resource-limited regions. Because these areas contain much of the planet's biodiversity, local scientists and institutions will be pivotal in addressing the biodiversity crisis. Ensuring access to affordable phylogeographic tools for identifying conservation-relevant evolutionary units and overcoming the taxonomic impediment is therefore not merely a technical consideration, but a strategic imperative for global biodiversity research.

== See also ==
- Random amplification of polymorphic DNA
- Arbitrarily primed PCR
- DNA amplification fingerprinting
- Amplified fragment length polymorphism
