= Genomic DNA =

Chromosomal DNA, in contrast to extra-chromosomal DNAs like plasmids

Genomic deoxyribonucleic acid (abbreviated as gDNA) is chromosomal DNA, in contrast to extra-chromosomal DNAs like plasmids. Most organisms have the same genomic DNA in every cell; however, only certain genes are active in each cell to allow for cell function and differentiation within the body. gDNA predominantly resides in the cell nucleus packed into dense chromosome structures. Chromatin refers to the combination of DNA and proteins that make up chromosomes. When a cell is not dividing, chromosomes exist as loosely packed chromatin mesh.

The genome of an organism (encoded by the genomic DNA) is the (biological) information of heredity which is passed from one generation of organism to the next. That genome is transcribed to produce various RNAs, which are necessary for the function of the organism. Precursor mRNA (pre-mRNA) is transcribed by RNA polymerase II in the nucleus. pre-mRNA is then processed by splicing to remove introns, leaving the exons in the mature messenger RNA (mRNA). Additional processing includes the addition of a 5' cap and a poly(A) tail to the pre-mRNA. The mature mRNA may then be transported to the cytosol and translated by the ribosome into a protein. Other types of RNA include ribosomal RNA (rRNA) and transfer RNA (tRNA). These types are transcribed by RNA polymerase I and RNA polymerase III, respectively, and are essential for protein synthesis. However 5s rRNA is the only rRNA which is transcribed by RNA Polymerase III.
