= Arbitrarily primed PCR =

DNA profiling technique

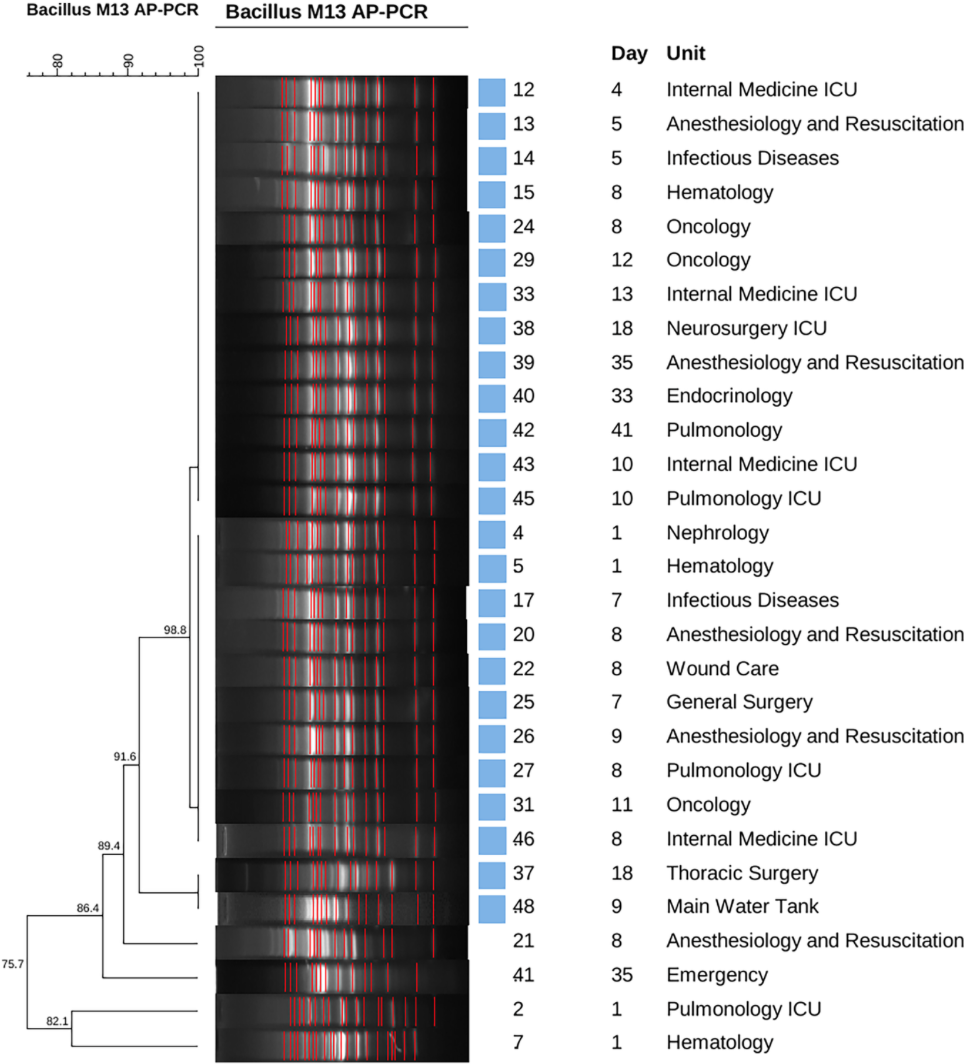
Arbitrarily-primed polymerase chain reaction of Bacillus licheniformis isolates from a hospital outbreak. DNA profile similarities were visualized with GelCompar II and assessed using UPGMA clustering and the Dice correlation coefficient.

Arbitrarily Primed Polymerase Chain Reaction (AP-PCR) is a DNA fingerprinting technique developed in 1990 by John Welsh and Michael McClelland. The method amplifies multiple anonymous loci using a single short primer of arbitrary sequence under low-stringency conditions. Amplified fragments are typically separated by polyacrylamide gel electrophoresis (PAGE) and visualized with radiolabeling to produce characteristic multilocus banding patterns. AP-PCR does not require prior sequence information and was among the first PCR–based genome scanning approaches developed for rapid DNA profiling (see arbitrarily amplified DNA).

== History ==
AP-PCR emerged during the early expansion of PCR-based marker systems. Random amplified polymorphic DNA (RAPD), described by Williams and colleagues, was the first to demonstrate that single arbitrary primers could generate polymorphic multilocus markers without prior sequence information. Shortly thereafter, Welsh and McClelland showed that similar arbitrarily primed PCR conditions could reproducibly produce genomic fingerprints from bacteria and other organisms, establishing the AP-PCR approach. DNA amplification fingerprinting (DAF), introduced subsequently by Caetano-Anollés and co-workers, further extended the strategy through the use of shorter primers and high-resolution electrophoretic detection. Together, these methods collectively established the conceptual framework of arbitrarily primed PCR and anonymous multilocus marker generation. Although terminological distinctions were initially emphasized, RAPD, AP-PCR, and DAF are now generally recognized as methodological variants within the broader class of arbitrarily amplified DNA (AAD) techniques.

== Principle and mechanism ==
AP-PCR uses a single oligonucleotide primer, typically 18–32 nucleotides in length, under conditions of reduced annealing stringency during early amplification cycles. Imperfect primer–template complementarity permits binding at multiple genomic locations. When two primer binding sites occur within amplifiable distance and in opposite orientation, exponential amplification produces discrete fragments. Later cycles at higher stringency selectively stabilize amplification of matched products. The resulting banding profile reflects a subset of genomic loci defined by primer sequence, thermocycling parameters, ionic strength, and template composition. Polymorphisms arise from nucleotide substitutions or insertions/deletions at primer binding sites, as well as length variation between sites. Because markers are scored as presence/absence of bands, AP-PCR loci are typically dominant.

== Applications ==
AP-PCR has been applied in microbial strain typing, epidemiological investigations, population genetics, and preliminary genetic mapping. In bacteria and fungi, it enables rapid discrimination among closely related isolates. Examples include tracking outbreaks in hospital (e.g. Bacillus licheniformis) or odontological settings. In plants and animals, AP-PCR markers have been used to estimate genetic diversity, identify cultivars or strains, and construct low-resolution linkage maps. An example is the identification of a gene associated with Wilms' tumors in humans. Prior to the widespread adoption of high-throughput sequencing and microsatellite or SNP genotyping platforms, AP-PCR provided an efficient strategy for genome-wide sampling in non-model organisms.

== Application to RNA ==
AP-PCR was subsequently adapted for the analysis of RNA populations through reverse transcription followed by arbitrarily primed PCR amplification. In this approach, complementary DNA (cDNA) synthesized from total or messenger RNA serves as template for amplification with single arbitrary primers under low-stringency conditions. The resulting banding patterns reflect subsets of expressed transcripts rather than genomic loci, enabling comparative analysis of gene expression among tissues, developmental stages, or environmental conditions. This strategy provided the conceptual basis for differential display methodologies and early transcript profiling techniques prior to the advent of high-throughput expression platforms.

== Advantages and limitations ==
AP-PCR is characterized by technical simplicity, low cost, and minimal DNA requirements. Multiple polymorphic loci can be generated in a single reaction without prior genomic knowledge. However, amplification profiles are sensitive to reaction conditions, including magnesium concentration, primer design, thermocycling parameters, and template quality. Inter-laboratory reproducibility may therefore vary if protocols are not standardized. The dominant nature of markers also limits direct assessment of heterozygosity. With the development of sequence-based genotyping technologies, AP-PCR has been largely superseded for high-resolution applications, although it remains useful for rapid and inexpensive genomic screening.

== See also ==
- Arbitrarily amplified DNA
- Random amplification of polymorphic DNA
- DNA amplification fingerprinting
- Amplified fragment length polymorphism
