= Random amplification of polymorphic DNA =

DNA profiling technique

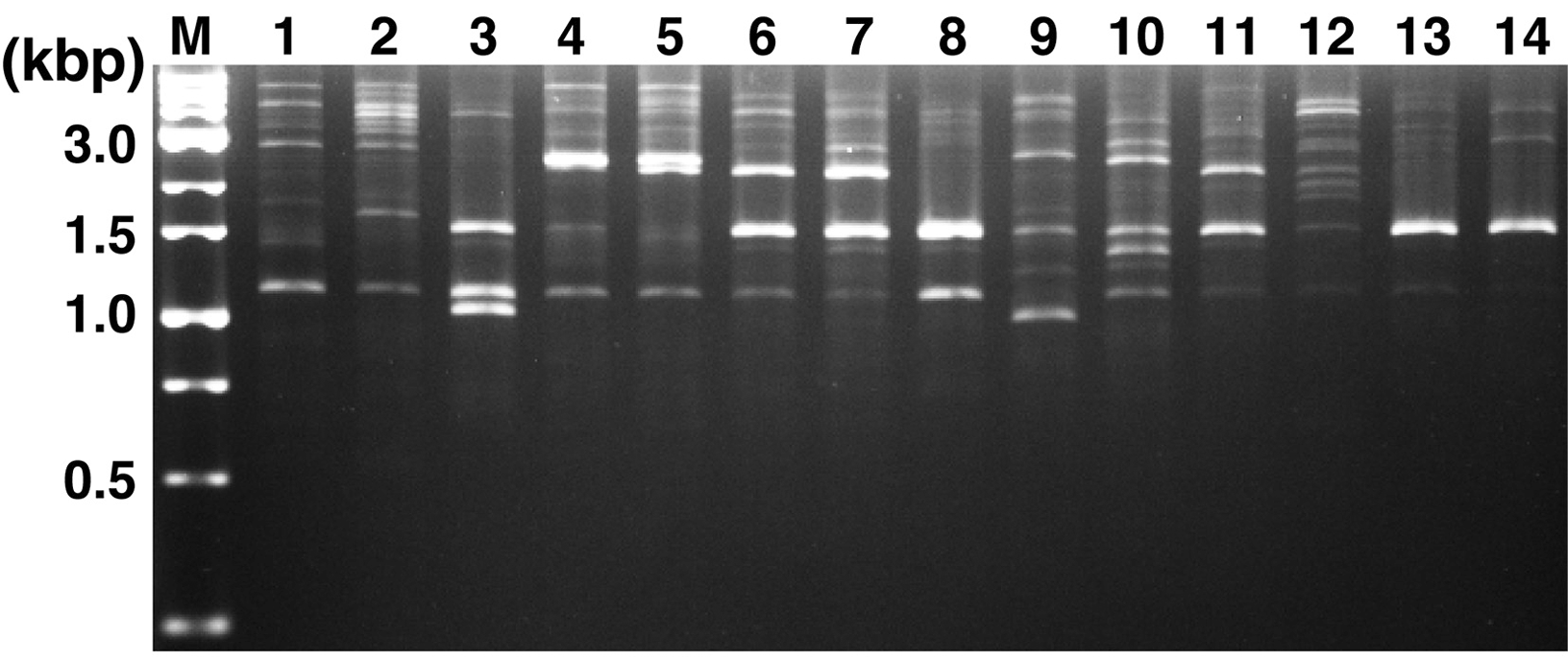
RAPD analysis with primer GCAGGATACG of strains of the single-cell free-living eukaryote, Paramecium caudatum.

Random amplified polymorphic DNA (RAPD), pronounced "rapid", is a DNA profiling technique that generates simple genomic fingerprints without requiring sequence information. Developed in the very early 1990s by Antoni Rafalski and colleagues at E.I. du Pont de Nemours (Wilmington, Delaware, USA), the technique uses short arbitrary primers, typically 10–12 nucleotides (nt) in length, and a polymerase chain reaction (PCR), to amplify anonymous regions in genomic DNA useful for genetic typing, strain discrimination, genome mapping, molecular ecology and population analysis. Primers anneal at numerous partially complementary sites, and those that occur in opposite orientation and within amplifiable distance (generally < 3–5 kb) are amplified and visualized by agarose gel electrophoresis and ethidium bromide staining. RAPD belongs to a family of arbitrarily amplified DNA profiling methods that include DNA amplification fingerprinting (DAF) and arbitrarily primed PCR (AP-PCR). These techniques use higher primer-to-template DNA ratios and shorter and longer primers, respectively, and produce more complex fingerprinting patterns.

== Mechanism ==
RAPD amplifies DNA using a thermostable DNA polymerase and one or more arbitrary primers under moderate annealing stringency, allowing primers to bind at multiple genomic sites with limited mismatch tolerance. Amplification occurs between oppositely oriented primer matches; once extension produces fragments with perfect primer complements at their termini, these amplicons become preferential templates and are exponentially enriched. The fragment pattern therefore reflects the genomic distribution of primer-matching motifs, distances between them, and polymorphisms (gain/loss of sites and indels) that alter fragment presence or size.

As in other arbitrarily amplified DNA methods, events in the first cycles determine which regions enter amplification. Early products compete for primer access, and only those that permit efficient primer binding and extension continue to amplify, while others drop out. Although secondary structures can form, their influence is less pronounced than in very low-stringency methods. As cycling proceeds, productive primer–template duplexes are preferentially converted into product, yielding a reproducible but less complex subset of genomic fragments characteristic of RAPD.

== Primers and amplification conditions ==
RAPD employs short, arbitrary 10-mer primers with balanced GC content (~40–80%) to promote annealing at multiple genomic sites under low-stringency PCR conditions. GC content is positively correlated with degree amplification, a correlation that is absent in DAF and suggest mechanistic differences between the two arbitrarily amplified DNA variants. Primer sequences are selected to minimize self-complementarity and palindromic motifs, reducing primer-dimer formation during amplification. Standardized commercial arbitrary primer kits (e.g., those originating from Operon Technologies and now supplied by Eurofins Genomics) are commonly used because they provide consistent performance and reproducible banding patterns across experiments. It is however advisable to test dilution series of the primers to explore amplification performance.

Due to the low-stringency nature of the RAPD technique, precise control over amplification conditions is crucial for generating reproducible and consistent DNA fingerprints. In particular, quantity and quality of DNA are main factors controlling reproducibility. For example, excessive DNA can lead to smearing or inconsistent banding patterns. Many primers fail to amplify products; to function, they may require optimization of magnesium concentration. Because RAPD is highly sensitive to reaction conditions, it is crucial to maintain strict standardization of components and to use the same thermocycler for all reactions, as variations in heating/cooling rates can lead to poor reproducibility between labs. Some practitioners suggest a hot start PCR method or a slow ramping between annealing and extension temperatures to improve reproducibility and reduce unwanted primer-dimer formation.

== Optimization ==
RAPD analysis demands careful optimization, with amplification highly sensitive to reaction composition and thermal cycling conditions. Because many interacting variables affect amplification efficiency, reproducibility and banding patterns, optimization is labor-intensive and typically relies on iterative or statistically designed experiments (e.g., matrix analysis, fractional factorial designs, or Taguchi experimental design methods) rather than exhaustive testing. Critical variables include magnesium, primer and DNA concentration, annealing temperature, polymerase type, and thermocycler performance. For example, reproducibility declines below a minimum template concentration and excessive DNA or a degraded template produces smearing or poor resolution. Typically, 5–25 ng of genomic DNA per 25 µL reaction is effective. Magnesium concentration must be empirically optimized (usually 1–4 mM), particularly when DNA is dissolved in TE buffer, as EDTA chelates Mg²⁺ and lowers its effective concentration. Low Mg²⁺ yields few bands. Because different thermostable DNA polymerases may amplify different products, their use must be optimized. RAPD is also highly sensitive to thermocycler behavior, affecting reproducibility across different laboratories. Differences in heating/cooling rates, temperature uniformity, and aging of Peltier elements can significantly affect results, even between identical models. Units lacking internal temperature probes may show discrepancies between block and sample temperatures. Periodic verification of thermal performance with a thermocouple is recommended, ideally annually.

== DNA separation and visualization ==
RAPD amplification products are typically separated using agarose gel electrophoresis and visualized with fluorescent intercalating dyes (e.g., ethidium bromide, SYBR Safe), or very rarely radioactive labeling. These techniques are sufficient to reveal distinct fingerprints. Products have also been separated with polyacrylamide gel electrophoresis (PAGE) and sometimes visualized using silver staining, techniques that are more labor–intensive, time–consuming, and expensive. Note that the simplicity and familiarity of agarose gel electrophoresis has popularized the use of RAPD, despite its low resolving power.

== Applications ==
RAPD profiles are widely used in assessment of genetic diversity and population structure, cultivar and species identification, forensic and microbial analysis, molecular ecology, and genetic mapping. RAPD analyses are used extensively for analyzing genetic relationships, population structure, and identifying cultivars in plants and animals. The technique can identify specific species (e.g. fungal isolates), distinguishing between closely related taxa. RAPD can differentiate between individuals in forensic science (e.g. forensic entomology and botany) and can be applied in an ecotoxicological context. It can identify microbial strains and be used to characterize, and trace, the phylogeny of a wide diversity of organisms. The arrival of massive parallel sequencing (e.g. metabarcoding, whole genome sequencing) has somehow displaced the use of RAPD and other arbitrarily amplified DNA techniques, though they continue to be valuable in unexpected fields (e.g. bacteriophage identification).

== Advantages and limitations ==
RAPD is a quick, cost-effective, and efficient PCR-based technique for genetic analysis that requires no prior sequence information, making it ideal for studying anonymous genomes. However, it is plagued by poor reproducibility between laboratories due to sensitivity to template and reaction conditions and produces dominant markers that cannot distinguish heterozygotes.

=== Advantages ===
- No prior sequence information required: A major advantage of RAPD and other arbitrarily amplified DNA techniques is that they do not require any prior knowledge of the target DNA, including its sequence. RAPD uses short, arbitrary 10-mer primers that amplify DNA whenever complementary sites occur in the correct orientation and proximity.
- Cost-effective, fast and efficient: Due to the lack of required prior knowledge, it is an ideal, popular, and cost-effective method for analyzing organisms that have not been heavily studied by the scientific community, such as wild species. In addition, RAPD is a fast and simple, easy-to-perform technique that requires only small amounts of template DNA, making it suitable for studies where sample availability is limited.
- Broadly applicable: The methods is highly versatile, useful for determining taxonomic identity, assessing kinship relationships, creating specific probes, and analyzing genetic diversity.
- Complemented by further analysis: The technique can be used as a starting point to identify specific bands that can then be cloned, sequenced, and converted into more stable markers. For example, RAPD bands can be converted into Sequence Characterized Amplified Region (SCAR) markers, which are co-dominant, specific, and highly reproducible.

=== Limitations ===
- Poorly reproducible: RAPD uses low primer-to-template DNA ratios, which makes it highly sensitive to PCR conditions (e.g., DNA concentration and PCR components) and notoriously laboratory-dependent. Lack of reproducibility is only offset by carefully optimized laboratory protocols. These limitations have caused some scientific journals to reject studies based solely on RAPD.
- Dominant markers: Almost all RAPD markers are dominant, meaning they only show the presence or absence of a band. This makes it impossible to distinguish between heterozygous (one copy) and homozygous (two copies) individuals, reducing the information content compared to co-dominant markers (e.g., SSRs).
- Sensitive to DNA quality: Because the technique is highly sensitive to PCR conditions and relies on arbitrary primers, it requires high-quality template DNA for consistent results and is prone to contamination from other, non-target DNA.
- Prone to uncertainties: Mismatches between the primer and the template can lead to a complete absence or reduction of DNA products, making the results hard to interpret compared to other arbitrarily amplified DNA and traditional PCR methods.

== See also ==
- Arbitrarily amplified DNA
- DNA amplification fingerprinting
- Arbitrarily primed PCR
- Amplified fragment length polymorphism
