= Amplified fragment length polymorphism =

DNA profiling tool

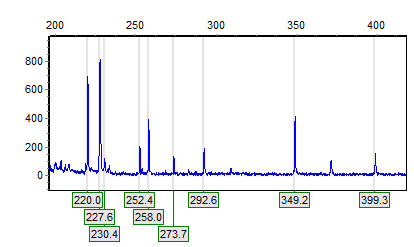
Example of AFLP data from a capillary electrophoresis instrument

Amplified fragment length polymorphism (AFLP-PCR or AFLP) is a PCR-based tool used in genetics research, DNA fingerprinting, and in the practice of genetic engineering. Developed in the early 1990s by Pieter Vos, AFLP uses restriction enzymes to digest genomic DNA, followed by ligation of adaptors to the sticky ends of the restriction fragments. A subset of the restriction fragments is then selected to be amplified. This selection is achieved by using primers complementary to the adaptor sequence, the restriction site sequence and a few nucleotides inside the restriction site fragments (as described in detail below). The amplified fragments are separated and visualized on denaturing on agarose gel electrophoresis, either through autoradiography or fluorescence methodologies, or via automated capillary sequencing instruments.

Although AFLP should not be used as an acronym, it is commonly referred to as "Amplified fragment length polymorphism" (borrowing the term "Amplification fragment length polymorphism" used in DNA amplification fingerprinting). However, the resulting data are not scored as length polymorphisms, but instead as presence-absence polymorphisms.

AFLP-PCR is a highly sensitive method for detecting polymorphisms in DNA. The technique was originally described by Vos and Zabeau in 1993. In detail, the procedure of this technique is divided into three steps:

1. Digestion of total cellular DNA with one or more restriction enzymes and ligation of restriction half-site specific adaptors to all restriction fragments.
2. Selective amplification of some of these fragments with two PCR primers that have corresponding adaptor and restriction site specific sequences.
3. Electrophoretic separation of amplicons on a gel matrix, followed by visualisation of the band pattern.

== Analysis ==
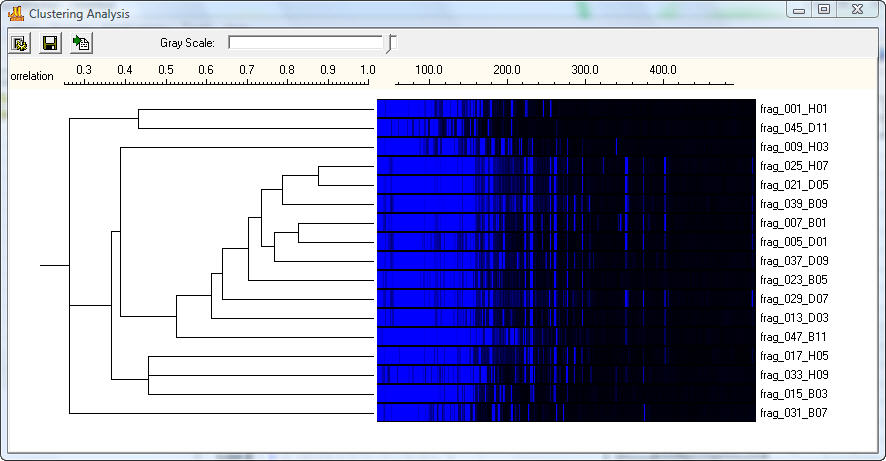
AFLP phylogeny analysis using hierarchical clustering, presented as a dendrogram

As mentioned earlier, the results of AFLP is scored as several sequences of presence-absence polymorphisms. The "sequences" can then be compared and hierarchical clustering can be used to produce a dendrogram.

- With methods such as UPGMA (commonly used for AFLP) and neighbor joining, a distance matrix is required. There are several ideas on how a distance matrix can be made:
  - Hill et al. (1996) uses the formula of Nei and Li (1979), which scores the presence or absence at each discrete length (0/1 marker sequence).
  - Not all gels are run to the point where lengths can be resolved in increments of 1 base (examples include the two images in the section), and even if they are distinguishable, counting bands is error-prone. Since 1999, studies deal with this issue by instead considering each result a sequence of density levels (like a one-pixel-tall picture). These sequences are compared to each other using Pearson correlation. This also has the advantage of making use of different density levels.
- Two separate Bayesian methods, one from MrBayes, the other from Luo et al. (2007), first translate the result into 0/1 marker sequences.
- One Bayesian method translates density-sequenecs into population structure parameters.

The issue with 0/1 marker sequences is that they are inherited in a dominant way, but most statistical methods used in ecology require codominant data. The density-sequence representation of the result of AFLP is suitable for dealing with this issue, so long as the change in density is due to actual change in the relative amount of nucleic acids of a certain size and not experimental error.

== Applications ==
The AFLP technology has the capability to detect various polymorphisms in different genomic regions simultaneously. It is also highly sensitive and reproducible. As a result, AFLP has become widely used for the identification of genetic variation in strains or closely related species of plants, fungi, animals, and bacteria. The AFLP technology has been used in criminal and paternity tests, also to determine slight differences within populations, and in linkage studies to generate maps for quantitative trait locus (QTL) analysis.

There are many advantages to AFLP when compared to other marker technologies including randomly amplified polymorphic DNA (RAPD), restriction fragment length polymorphism (RFLP), and microsatellites. AFLP not only has higher reproducibility, resolution, and sensitivity at the whole genome level compared to other techniques, but it also has the capability to amplify between 50 and 100 fragments at one time. This makes it comparable to another arbitrarily amplified DNA technique, DNA amplification fingerprinting (DAF). In addition, no prior sequence information is needed for amplification. As a result, AFLP has become extremely beneficial in the study of taxa including bacteria, fungi, and plants, where much is still unknown about the genomic makeup of various organisms.

== Legal status ==
The AFLP technology is covered by patents and patent applications of Keygene N.V. AFLP is a registered trademark of Keygene N.V.

== See also ==
- Arbitrarily amplified DNA
- Random amplification of polymorphic DNA
- Arbitrarily primed PCR
- DNA amplification fingerprinting
