= Anterior nares =

Anterior nares are the external (or "proper") portion of the nose. The anterior nares open into the nasal cavity and allow the inhalation and exhalation of air. Each is an oval opening that measures about 1.5 cm anteroposteriorly and about 1 cm in diameter.

== Common infections ==
The anterior nares are commonly infected by Staphylococcus aureus (also known as "golden staph") which may contribute to dermatitis skin lesions in patients with atopic dermatitis. The anterior nares can act as a colonizing point from which the infection can spread. This can be particularly troublesome if the strain is an antibiotic-resistant (commonly MRSA or ORSA) strain. MRSA (first discovered in the UK in 1961) has become particularly widespread in hospitals and is commonly considered a super bug.

== See also ==
- Rhinoplasty (plastic surgery of the nose)
