= Apps to analyse COVID-19 sounds =

Mobile software application

Apps to analyse COVID-19 sounds are mobile software applications designed to collect respiratory sounds and aid diagnosis in response to the COVID-19 pandemic. Most efforts were aimed at gathering data. In order to develop and train signal analysis approaches, large datasets are required.

== History ==
The COVID-19 outbreak was announced as a global pandemic by the World Health Organization in March 2020 and has affected a growing number of people globally. In this context, advanced artificial intelligence techniques are being considered as tools in aiding our response to global health crisis. Other COVID-19 apps which offer solutions for user tracking have been developed. At the same time a number of approaches which tries to use respiratory sounds and artificial intelligence to understand if the disease can be diagnosed have been proposed. A few studies are available as preprints (i.e. not yet peer-reviewed) documents.

== Methodologies ==
The potential for using speech and sound analysis by artificial intelligence to help in this scenario, by surveying which types of related or contextually significant phenomena can be automatically assessed from speech or sound has been recently overviewed. These include the automatic recognition and monitoring of breathing, dry and wet coughing or sneezing sounds, speech under cold, eating behaviour, sleepiness, or pain.

Additionally, the potential use-cases of intelligent speech analysis for COVID-19 diagnosed patients has also been presented. In particular, by analysing speech recordings from these patients, an audio-only-based model to automatically categorise the health state of patients from four aspects, including the severity of illness, sleep quality, fatigue, and anxiety, is constructed. This work shows promise in estimating the severity of illness.

Machine learning methods have been explored to recognize and diagnose coughs from different diseases. These included a low complexity, automated recognition and diagnostic tool for screening respiratory infections that utilizes convolutional neural networks (CNNs) to detect cough within environment audio and diagnose three potential illnesses (i.e. bronchitis, bronchiolitis and pertussis) based on their unique cough audio features.

A large-scale crowdsourced dataset of respiratory sounds has been collected to aid diagnosis of COVID-19: coughs and breathing sounds are sufficient to distinguish users affected by COVID-19 versus those affected by asthma or healthy controls.

Behind these studies is the ambition that automated systems to screen for respiratory diseases based on voice, raw cough or other sound data would have positive medical applications in both clinical and public health arenas.

== List of apps to analyse COVID-19 sounds ==
Name	Functionality and aim/stage of project	Nature of Sounds recorded, and other metadata	Sponsor of project (University / Company / grassroots)	Platforms	Ethical approval	Cumulative Samples Collected (with date)	Languages	Data Release
COVID-19 Sounds App	Audio data collection to establish diagnostic potential	Cough, breathing and voice + symptoms and elements of medical history.	University of Cambridge	Web, Android, iOS	Cambridge Univ. Computer Lab. Ethics Committee.	6000 (1 May 20)	English, German, French, Italian, Spanish, Greek, Portuguese	Pending legal advice. Hoping to be made available to researchers, subject to legal framework protecting privacy.
Breathe for Science	Audio data collection to establish diagnostic potential	Cough and elements of medical history	New York University	Web				
COVID Voice Detector	Audio data collection, diagnosis	Voice	Carnegie Mellon University	Web				
Coughvid	Audio data collection	Cough	École Polytechnique Fédérale de Lausanne	Web, Android				
VoiceMed	Audio data collection, diagnosis	Cough, breathing and voice		Web				
Detectnow	Audio data collection	Cough		Web		489 (7 May 20)		
Coughmode	Audio data collection	Cough, COVID-19 symptoms	Healthmode, Inc.	Web, iOS (https://coughmode.com)	Advarra Central IRB			
COVID-19 Voice Study	Audio data collection, medical advice	Voice	Vocalis Health	Web				
Cough Against Covid	Audio data collection to establish screening potential	Cough, Voice, Symptoms	Wadhwani Institute for Artificial Intelligence	Web	State governments of Odisha, Bihar, Brihanmumbai Municipal Corporation			
Virufy	Audio data collection	Cough, voice	Stanford University (unofficial)	Web, Android, iOS		5000	English, Spanish, Portuguese	https://github.com/virufy/covid
