= Boom method =

Boom method (aka Boom nucleic acid extraction method) is a solid phase extraction method for isolating nucleic acid from a biological sample. This method is characterized by "absorbing the nucleic acids (NA) to the silica beads".

== Overview ==
The Boom method (Boom nucleic acid extraction method) is a solid phase extraction method for isolating nucleic acids (NA) from biological samples. Silica beads are a key element to this method, which are capable of binding the nucleic acids in the presence of a chaotropic substance according to the chaotropic effect. This method is one of the most widespread methods for isolating nucleic acids from biological samples and is known as a simple, rapid, and reliable method for the small-scale purification of nucleic acid from biological sample.

This method is said to have been developed and invented by Willem R. Boom et al. around 1990. (Note: Estimated from priority date of Boom, et al.; US5234809 , EP0389063 and their family patents.) While the chaotropic effect was previously known and reported by other scientists, (Note: The following articles was cited in the "Boom, et al.; US5234809 , EP0389063 and their family patents".: B Vogelstein and D Gillespie; "Preparative and analytical purification of DNA from agarose" PNAS 1979, vol. 76, no. 2, pp. 615–619.) Boom et al. contributed an optimization of the method to complex starting materials, such as body fluids and other biological starting materials, and provided a short procedure according to the Boom et al. US5234809. After the Boom et al. patent was filed, similar applications were also filed by other parties.

In a narrow sense, the word "silica" meant SiO_{2} crystals; however, other forms of silica particles are available. In particular, amorphous silicon oxide and glass powder, alkylsilica, aluminum silicate (zeolite), or, activated silica with -NH_{2}, are all suitable as nucleic acid binding solid phase material according to this method. Today, the concepts of the Boom method, characterized by utilizing magnetic silica particles, are widely used. With this method, magnetic silica beads are captured by a magnetic bead collector, such as the Tajima pipette, Pick pen(R), Quad Pole collector, and so on.

== Brief procedure ==
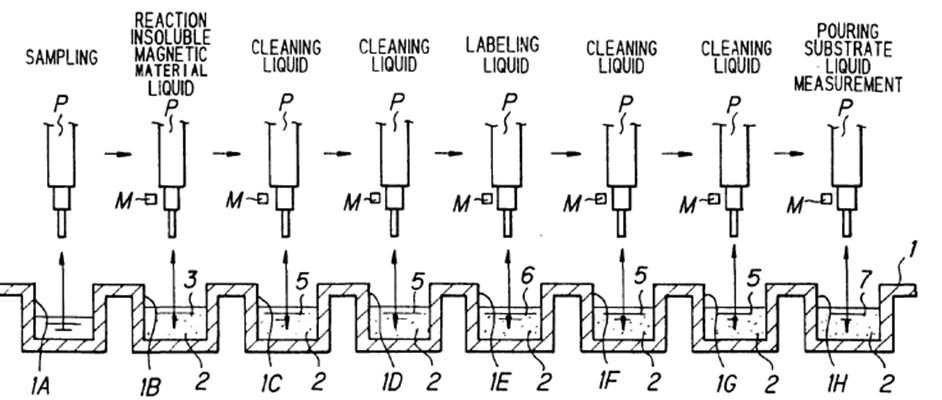
Fig. 1: Boom method by Tajima pipette and magnetic silica beads. Schematic structure of Tajima pipette are shown in Fig. 2. Apparatus and methods are mainly intended to the immune system. However, alternative embodiment for nucleic acids extraction assay are also mentioned in this patent and procedure of Fig.1 is generally similar to Boom method.

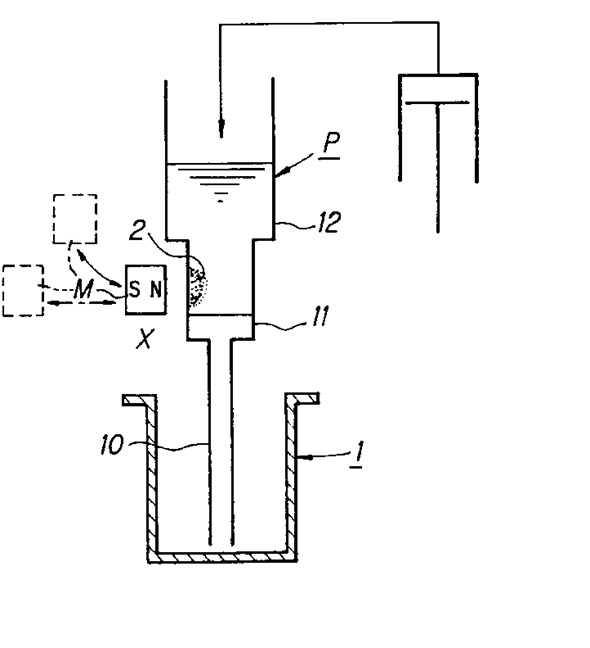
Fig. 2: Schematic structure of Tajima pipette

The fundamental process for isolating nucleic acid from starting material of Boom method consists of the following 4 steps (See Fig. 1).

(a) Lysing and/or Homogenizing the starting material.
Lysate of starting material is obtained by addition of a detergent in the presence of protein degrading enzymes.

(b) Mixing chaotropic substance and silica beads into the starting material.
Lysate of starting material of (a) is mixed with silica beads and sufficiently large amounts of chaotropic substance. According to the chaotropic effect, released nucleic acids will be bound to the silica beads almost instantaneously. In this way, silica-nucleic acid complexes are formed. The reasons why nucleic acids and silica form bonds will be described in the following section (Basic principles).

(c) Washing silica beads
Silica beads of (b) are washed several times to remove contaminants. Process of washing of the silica-nucleic acid complexes (silica beads) typically consists of following steps,

- Collecting silica beads from the liquid by for example Tajima pipette (see Fig. 1,2) or Pellet-down (by rapid sedimentation and disposal of the supernatant )
- Mixing silica beads into the chaotropic salt-containing washing buffer using, e. g., a vortex mixer.
- Collecting redispersed silica beads from above mentioned washing buffer again.
- Further washing successively with an alcohol-water solution (Note: According original method by Boom, preferably 70% ethanol to restrict losses in yield.) and then with acetone.
- Beads will preferably be dried.

(d) Separating the bonded nucleic acids
Pure nucleic acids are eluted into buffer by decreasing the concentration of chaotropic substance. Nucleic acids present in the washed (and preferably dried) silica-nucleic acid complexes is eluted into chosen elution buffer such as TE buffer, aqua bidest, and so on. The selection of the elution buffer is co-determined by the contemplated use of the isolated nucleic acid.

In this way, pure nucleic acids are isolated from the starting material.

By altering the experimental conditions, especially the composition of reagents (chaotropic substance, wash buffer, etc) more specific isolation can be achieved. For example, some compositions of reagents are suitable for obtaining long double-stranded DNA or short single-stranded RNA.

A wide variety of starting biological material are available, including whole blood, blood serum, buffy coat, urine, feces, cerebrospinal fluid, sperm, saliva, tissues, cell cultures, food products, or vaccines. Optimization of procedure is required to maximize yield of nucleic acids from different starting materials or different types of nucleic acids (eg long/short, DNA/RNA, linear/circular, double-stranded/single-stranded).

Today, the assay characterized by using silica coated magnetic beads seems to be the most common. Therefore, in this article, "silica beads" are intended to mean silica coated magnetic beads unless stated otherwise.

=== Magnetic beads ===
Various magnetic particles (magnetic carrier) coated with silica are often used as silica coated beads Maghemite particle (γ-Fe_{2}O_{3}) and magnetite particle (Fe_{3}O_{4}), as well as an intermediate iron oxide particle thereof, are most suitable as magnetic carriers.

Generally, the quality of the magnetic beads is characterized by following parameters:

- saturation magnetization (～10-80 A m2/kg (emu/g):Superparamagnetic),
- coercive force (～ 0.80-15.92 kA/m),
- size diameter (～ 0.1-0.5 μm),
- mass of each particle (～ 2.7 ng), (Note: Order estimation procedures for estimating are as follows.: Radius of each particle (r) is about; 0.5 μm $=0.5 \frac{1}{10^6}\frac{100}{1} cm =0.5\times 10^{-4} cm$.: So, volume of each particle (V) is about 5.2*10^{−13} cm^{3} by; $$V=2\times \frac{2}{3}\pi r^3=\frac{4}{3}\pi {r}^{3}$$.: When we supposed that magnatic particle are Fe_{3}O_{4} then, the density (D) 5.17 g/cm^{3}.; So weight (w) of each particle is about; w=VD=2.7 pg)
- ease of collection (to be mentioned later),
- capture ability (to be mentioned later),
- Sedimentation rate (～4% in 30 min),
- Area ratio (> 100 m^{2}/g),
- Effective density (～ 2.5 g/cm^{3}), and
- Particle counts (～ 1 × 10^{8} particles/mg).

Here, "ease of collection" is defined and compared by

"magnetic beads are collected by not less than X wt % (～90wt %) within T seconds(～ 3 seconds) in the presence of a magnetic field of Y gauss (～3000 gauss) when it is dispersed in an amount of at least Z mg (～20 mg) in W mL (～1 mL) of an aqueous solution of a sample containing a biological substance"

while capture ability are defined and compared by

"binding with at least A μg (～0.4μg) of the biological substance per B mg (～1 mg) thereof when it is dispersed in an amount of at least Z mg (～20 mg) in W mL (～1 mL) of an aqueous solution of a sample containing a biological substance".

== Basic principles ==
The principle of this method is based on the nucleic acid-binding properties of silica particles or diatoms in the presence of a chaotropic agent, which follows the chaotropic effect.

Put simply, the chaotropic effect is where a chaotropic anion in an aqueous solution disturbs the structure of water, and weakens the hydrophobic interaction.

In a broad sense, "chaotropic agent" stands for any substance capable of altering the secondary, tertiary and/or quaternary structure of proteins and nucleic acids, but leaving at least the primary structure intact.

An aqueous solution of chaotropic salt is a chaotropic agent. Chaotropic anions increase the entropy of the system by interfering with intermolecular interactions mediated by non-covalent forces such as hydrogen bonds, van der Waals forces, and hydrophobic effects. Examples thereof are aqueous solution of: thiocyanate ion, iodine ion, perchlorate ion, nitrate ion, bromine ion, chlorine ion, acetate ion, fluorine ion, and sulfate ion, or mutual combinations therewith. According to the original Boom method, the chaotropic guanidinium salt employed is preferably guanidinium thiocyanate (GuSCN).

According to the chaotropic effect, in the presence of the chaotropic agent, hydration water of nucleic acids are taken from the phosphodiester bond of the phosphate group of the backbone of a nucleic acid. Thus, the phosphate group becomes "exposed" and hydrophobic interaction between silica and exposed phosphate group are formed.

== Automated instruments ==
=== Tajima pipette ===
Nucleic acid extraction apparatus based on the Tajima pipette (see Fig. 2) are one of the most widespread instruments to perform the Boom method.

The Tajima pipette was invented by Hideji Tajima, founder and president of Precision System Sciences (PSS) Inc., a Japanese manufacturer of precision and measuring instruments. Tajima pipette is a Core Technology of PSS Inc. PSS Inc. provides OEM product based on this technology (for example MagNA Pure(R) ) for several leading reagent manufacturers such as Hoffmann-La Roche, Life Technologies, ... and so on. After the Tajima et al. patent was filed, similar patent applications have also been filed by other parties.

The Tajima pipette performs magnetic particle control method and procedure, which can separate magnetic particles combined with a target substance from the liquid by magnetic force and suspend them in a liquid.

==== Configurations ====
The pipette itself is an apparatus comprising following members (see Fig. 2).

pipette tip configured to be able to access and aspirate/discharge liquid from/into each of vessels, having

a front end portion,
a reservoir portion,
a liquid passage

connecting the front end portion and the reservoir portion,

a separation region

in the liquid passage subjected to an action of a magnetic field, and

a mechanism

for applying a negative or positive pressure to the interior of the pipette portion to draw or discharge a magnetic substance suspended liquid into or from the pipette portion

magnetic field Source

arranged on the outside of and adjacent to pipette tip; and

magnetic field source driving device

for driving the magnetic field source to apply or remove a magnetic field to or from the separation region from outside the liquid passage. When the magnet is brought close to the pipette tip, a magnetic field is applied; when retracted away from the pipette tip, that magnetic field is removed.

A nucleic acid extraction apparatus incorporating Tajima pipettes typically consists of:

Above mentioned Tajima pipette,
Plurality of tubes.
Plurality of tube holder for above mentioned tubes,
Transport mean

to transport Tajima pipette among that plurality of tubes (tubes are supported by tube holder), and

Control device

for controlling abovementioned devices.

==== Motions ====
(a) Capturing of the magnetic beads.
During this suction process, when the magnetic field are applied to the separation region of piper tip, from outside of pipette tip, by the magnet arranged on the outside of the pipette tip, as liquid containing magnetic beads passes through a separation region of the pipette tip, the magnetic particles are attracted to and arrested to the inner wall of tile separation region of pipette tip.

Subsequently, when that solution are discharged under the conditions of has been kept the magnetic field, magnetic particles only are left in the inside of pipette tip. In this way magnetic particles are separated from liquid.

In accordance with Tajima, the preferable suction height of the mixture liquid is such that

the bottom level of the liquid is higher than the lower end of the separation region of the liquid passage (That means bottom level of the liquid is higher than the lower end of the magnet.),

when all the mixture liquid is drawn up,
so as to ensure that the aspirated magnetic particles can be completely arrested.

At this time, because the magnetic particles are wet, they stay attached to the inner surface of the separation region of the liquid passage of the pipette tip. If the pipette tip P is moved or transported, the magnetic particles will not come off easily.

(b) Re-suspension of the captured magnetic beads.

After the magnetic particles are arrested by above mentioned manner (a),

so the mixture liquid removed of the magnetic particles is discharged into the liquid accommodating portion (Vessel) and drained out, with only the magnetic particles remaining in the pipette tip,

we can do the re-suspension process.

Re-suspension of the captured magnetic beads are in detail, consists of the following steps. Of cause, we consider that, the state in which that magnetic material has been captured by above mention way.

- Aspirate liquid such as washing buffer into the tip
- Quit the application of a magnetic field

By "Quit the application of a magnetic field" the magnetic particles are suspended in the liquid.

- Discharging the liquid (such as washing buffer) from pipette tip to vessel (in the condition of magnetic force generated by the magnet body is cut off.).

==== Operations ====
An example of the operations of the nucleic acid extraction apparatus which incorporates Tajima pipette are typically as shown in Fig. 1.

=== Other methods ===
Examples of other type of method of the magnetic particle capturing device are as follows.

- Pen type capture
- Tube type capture

== See also ==
- Chaotropic agent
- DNA extraction
- DNA separation by silica adsorption
- Ethanol precipitation
- Minicolumn purification
- Nucleic acid methods
- Phenol-chloroform extraction
- RNA extraction
