= Nucleic acid methods =

Techniques used to study nucleic acids

Nucleic acid methods are the techniques used to study nucleic acids: DNA and RNA.

== Purification ==
- DNA extraction
- Phenol–chloroform extraction
- Minicolumn purification
- RNA extraction
- Boom method
- Synchronous coefficient of drag alteration (SCODA) DNA purification

== Quantification ==
- Abundance in weight: spectroscopic nucleic acid quantitation
- Absolute abundance in number: real-time polymerase chain reaction (quantitative PCR)
- High-throughput relative abundance: DNA microarray
- High-throughput absolute abundance: serial analysis of gene expression (SAGE)
- Size: gel electrophoresis

== Synthesis ==
- De novo: oligonucleotide synthesis
- Amplification: polymerase chain reaction (PCR), loop-mediated isothermal amplification (LAMP), transcription-mediated amplification (TMA)

== Kinetics ==
- Multi-parametric surface plasmon resonance
- Dual-polarization interferometry
- Quartz crystal microbalance with dissipation monitoring (QCM-D)

== Gene function ==
- RNA interference

== Other ==
- Bisulfite sequencing
- DNA sequencing
- Expression cloning
- Fluorescence in situ hybridization
- Lab-on-a-chip
- Comparison of nucleic acid simulation software
- Northern blot
- Nuclear run-on assay
- Radioactivity in the life sciences
- Southern blot
- Differential centrifugation (sucrose gradient)
- Toeprinting assay
- Several bioinformatics methods, as seen in list of RNA structure prediction software

== See also ==
- CSH Protocols
- Current Protocols
