= Plasmid preparation =

Biological method of DNA extraction and purification

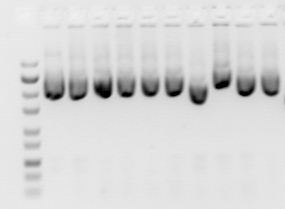
Plasmid miniprep. 0.8% agarose gel ethidium bromide-stained.

A plasmid preparation is a method of DNA extraction and purification for plasmid DNA. It is an important step in many molecular biology experiments and is essential for the successful use of plasmids in research and biotechnology. Many methods have been developed to purify plasmid DNA from bacteria. During the purification procedure, the plasmid DNA is often separated from contaminating proteins and genomic DNA.

These methods invariably involve three steps: growth of the bacterial culture, harvesting and lysis of the bacteria, and purification of the plasmid DNA. Purification of plasmids is central to molecular cloning. A purified plasmid can be used for many standard applications, such as sequencing and transfections into cells.

== Growth of the bacterial culture ==
Plasmids are almost always purified from liquid bacteria cultures, usually E. coli, which have been transformed and isolated. Virtually all plasmid vectors in common use encode one or more antibiotic resistance genes as a selectable marker, for example a gene encoding ampicillin or kanamycin resistance, which allows bacteria that have been successfully transformed to multiply uninhibited. Bacteria that have not taken up the plasmid vector are assumed to lack the resistance gene, and thus only colonies representing successful transformations are expected to grow. Bacteria are grown under favourable conditions.

== Harvesting and lysis of the bacteria ==
There are several methods for cell lysis, including alkaline lysis, mechanical lysis, and enzymatic lysis.

=== Alkaline lysis ===
The most common method is alkaline lysis, which involves the use of a high concentration of a basic solution, such as sodium hydroxide, to lyse the bacterial cells. When bacteria are lysed under alkaline conditions (pH 12.0–12.5) both chromosomal DNA and protein are denatured; the plasmid DNA however, remains stable. Some scientists reduce the concentration of NaOH used to 0.1M in order to reduce the occurrence of ssDNA. After the addition of acetate-containing neutralization buffer to lower the pH to around 7, the large and less supercoiled chromosomal DNA and proteins form large complexes and precipitate; but the small bacterial DNA plasmids stay in solution.

=== Mechanical lysis ===
Mechanical lysis involves the use of physical force, such as grinding or sonication, to break down bacterial cells and release the plasmid DNA. There are several different mechanical lysis methods that can be used, including French press, bead-beating, and ultrasonication.

=== Enzymatic lysis ===
Enzymatic lysis, also called Lysozyme lysis, involves the use of enzymes to digest the cell wall and release the plasmid DNA. The most commonly used enzyme for this purpose is lysozyme, which breaks down the peptidoglycan in the cell wall of Gram-positive bacteria. Lysozyme is usually added to the bacterial culture, followed by heating and/or shaking the culture to release the plasmid DNA.

== Preparations by size ==
Plasmid preparation can be divided into five main categories based on the scale of the preparation: minipreparation, midipreparation, maxipreparation, megapreparation, and gigapreparation. The choice of which method to use will depend on the amount of plasmid DNA required, as well as the specific application for which it will be used.

Kits are available from varying manufacturers to purify plasmid DNA, which are named by size of bacterial culture and corresponding plasmid yield. In increasing order they are: miniprep, midiprep, maxiprep, megaprep, and gigaprep. The plasmid DNA yield will vary depending on the plasmid copy number, type and size, the bacterial strain, the growth conditions, and the kit.

=== Minipreparation ===
Minipreparation of plasmid DNA is a rapid, small-scale isolation of plasmid DNA from bacteria. Commonly used miniprep methods include alkaline lysis and spin-column based kits. It is based on the alkaline lysis method. The extracted plasmid DNA resulting from performing a miniprep is itself often called a "miniprep". Minipreps are used in the process of molecular cloning to analyze bacterial clones. A typical plasmid DNA yield of a miniprep is 5 to 50 μg depending on the cell strain. Miniprep of a large number of plasmids can also be done conveniently on filter paper by lysing the cell and eluting the plasmid on to filter paper.

=== Midipreparation ===
The starting E. coli culture volume is 15-25 mL of Lysogeny broth (LB) and the expected DNA yield is 100-350 μg.

=== Maxipreparation ===
The starting E. coli culture volume is 100-200 mL of LB and the expected DNA yield is 500-850 μg.

=== Megapreparation ===
The starting E. coli culture volume is 500 mL – 2.5 L of LB and the expected DNA yield is 1.5-2.5 mg.

=== Gigapreparation ===
The starting E. coli culture volume is 2.5-5 L of LB and the expected DNA yield is 7.5–10 mg.

== Purification of plasmid DNA ==
It is important to consider the downstream applications of the plasmid DNA when choosing a purification method. For example, if the plasmid is to be used for transfection or electroporation, a purification method that results in high purity and low endotoxin levels is desirable. Similarly, if the plasmid is to be used for sequencing or PCR, a purification method that results in high yield and minimal contaminants is desirable. However, multiple methods of nucleic acid purification exist. All work on the principle of generating conditions where either only the nucleic acid precipitates, or only other biomolecules precipitate, allowing the nucleic acid to be separated.

=== Ethanol precipitation ===
Ethanol precipitation is a widely used method for purifying and concentrating nucleic acids, including plasmid DNA. The basic principle of this method is that nucleic acids are insoluble in ethanol or isopropanol but soluble in water. Therefore, it works by using ethanol as an antisolvent of DNA, causing it to precipitate out of solution and then it can be collected by centrifugation. The soluble fraction is discarded to remove other biomolecules.

=== Spin column ===
Spin column-based nucleic acid purification is a method of purifying DNA, RNA or plasmid from a sample using a spin column filter. The method is based on the principle of selectively binding nucleic acids to a solid matrix in the spin column, while other contaminants, such as proteins and salts, are washed away. The conditions are then changed to elute the purified nucleic acid off the column using a suitable elution buffer.

=== Phenol–chloroform extraction ===
The basic principle of the phenol-chloroform extraction is that DNA and RNA are relatively insoluble in phenol and chloroform, while other cellular components are relatively soluble in these solvents. The addition of a phenol/chloroform mixture will dissolve protein and lipid contaminants, leaving the nucleic acids in the aqueous phase. It also denatures proteins, like DNase, which is especially important if the plasmids are to be used for enzyme digestion. Otherwise, smearing may occur in enzyme restricted form of plasmid DNA.

=== Beads-based extraction ===
In beads-based extraction, addition of a mixture containing magnetic beads commonly made of iron ions binds to plasmid DNA, separating them from unwanted compounds by a magnetic rod or stand. The plasmid-bound beads are then released by removal of the magnetic field and extracted in an elution solution for down-stream experiments such as transformation or restriction digestion. This form of miniprep can also be automated, which increases the conveniency while reducing mechanical error.
