= DNA extraction =

Process of isolating DNA from cells

The first isolation of deoxyribonucleic acid (DNA) was done in 1869 by Friedrich Miescher. DNA extraction is the process of isolating DNA from the cells of an organism isolated from a sample, typically a biological sample such as blood, saliva, or tissue. It involves breaking open the cells, removing proteins and other contaminants, and purifying the DNA so that it is free of other cellular components. The purified DNA can then be used for downstream applications such as PCR, sequencing, or cloning. Currently, it is a routine procedure in molecular biology or forensic analyses.

This process can be done in several ways, depending on the type of the sample and the downstream application, the most common methods are: mechanical, chemical and enzymatic lysis, precipitation, purification, and concentration. The specific method used to extract the DNA, such as phenol-chloroform extraction, alcohol precipitation, or silica-based purification.

For the chemical method, many different kits are used for extraction, and selecting the correct one will save time on kit optimization and extraction procedures. PCR sensitivity detection is considered to show the variation between the commercial kits.

There are many different methods for extracting DNA, but some common steps include:

1. Lysis: This step involves breaking open the cells to release the DNA. For example, in the case of bacterial cells, a solution of detergent and salt (such as SDS) can be used to disrupt the cell membrane and release the DNA. For plant and animal cells, mechanical or enzymatic methods are often used.
2. Precipitation: Once the DNA is released, proteins and other contaminants must be removed. This is typically done by adding a precipitating agent, such as alcohol (such as ethanol or isopropanol), or a salt (such as ammonium acetate). The DNA will form a pellet at the bottom of the solution, while the contaminants will remain in the liquid.
3. Purification: After the DNA is precipitated, it is usually further purified by using column-based methods. For example, silica-based spin columns can be used to bind the DNA, while contaminants are washed away. Alternatively, a centrifugation step can be used to purify the DNA by spinning it down to the bottom of a tube.
4. Concentration: Finally, the amount of DNA present is usually increased by removing any remaining liquid. This is typically done by using a vacuum centrifugation or a lyophilization (freeze-drying) step.

Some variations on these steps may be used depending on the specific DNA extraction protocol. Additionally, some kits are commercially available that include reagents and protocols specifically tailored to a specific type of sample.

== What does it deliver? ==
DNA extraction is frequently a preliminary step in many diagnostic procedures used to identify environmental viruses and bacteria and diagnose illnesses and hereditary diseases. These methods consist of, but are not limited to:

Fluorescence In Situ Hybridization (FISH) technique was developed in the 1980s. The basic idea is to use a nucleic acid probe to hybridize nuclear DNA from either interphase cells or metaphase chromosomes attached to a microscopic slide. It is a molecular method used, among other things, to recognize and count particular bacterial groupings.

To recognize, define, and quantify the geographical and temporal patterns in marine bacterioplankton communities, researchers employ a technique called terminal restriction fragment length polymorphism (T-RFLP).

Sequencing: Whole or partial genomes and other chromosomal components, ended for comparison with previously published sequences.

== Basic procedure ==
- Cells that are to be studied need to be collected.
- Breaking the cell membranes open exposes the DNA along with the cytoplasm within (cell lysis).
  - Lipids from the cell membrane and the nucleus are broken down with detergents and surfactants.
  - Breaking down proteins by adding a protease (optional).
  - Breaking down RNA by adding an RNase (optional).
- The solution is treated with a concentrated salt solution (saline) to make debris such as broken proteins, lipids, and RNA clump together.
- Centrifugation of the solution, which separates the clumped cellular debris from the DNA.
- DNA purification from detergents, proteins, salts, and reagents is used during the cell lysis step. The most commonly used procedures are:
  - Ethanol precipitation usually by ice-cold ethanol or isopropanol. Since DNA is insoluble in these alcohols, it will aggregate together, giving a pellet upon centrifugation. Precipitation of DNA is improved by increasing ionic strength, usually by adding sodium acetate.
  - Phenol–chloroform extraction in which phenol denatures proteins in the sample. After centrifugation of the sample, denatured proteins stay in the organic phase while the aqueous phase containing nucleic acid is mixed with chloroform to remove phenol residues from the solution.
  - Minicolumn purification relies on the fact that the nucleic acids may bind (adsorption) to the solid phase (silica or other) depending on the pH and the salt concentration of the buffer.

Cellular and histone proteins bound to the DNA can be removed either by adding a protease or having precipitated the proteins with sodium or ammonium acetate or extracted them with a phenol-chloroform mixture before the DNA precipitation.

After isolation, the DNA is dissolved in a slightly alkaline buffer, usually in a TE buffer, or in ultra-pure water.

== Common chemicals ==
The most common chemicals used for DNA extraction include:

1. Detergents, such as SDS or Tween-20, which are used to break open cells and release the DNA.
2. Protease enzymes, such as Proteinase K, which are used to digest proteins that may be binding to the DNA.
3. Phenol and chloroform, which are used to separate the DNA from other cellular components.
4. Ethanol or isopropanol, which are used to precipitate the DNA.
5. Salt, such as NaCl, which is often used to help dissolve the DNA and maintain its stability.
6. EDTA, which inactivates enzymes such as nucleases by chelating (binding) metals ions needed as cofactors.
7. Tris-HCL, which is used to maintain the pH at the optimal condition for DNA extraction.

== Method selection ==
Some of the most common DNA extraction methods include organic extraction, Chelex extraction, and solid phase extraction. These methods consistently yield isolated DNA, but they differ in both the quality and the quantity of DNA yielded. When selecting a DNA extraction method, there are multiple factors to consider, including cost, time, safety, and risk of contamination.

Organic extraction involves the addition of incubation in multiple different chemical solutions; including a lysis step, a phenol-chloroform extraction, an ethanol precipitation, and washing steps. Organic extraction is often used in laboratories because it is cheap, and it yields large quantities of pure DNA. Though it is easy, there are many steps involved, and it takes longer than other methods. It also involves the unfavorable use of the toxic chemicals phenol and chloroform, and there is an increased risk of contamination due to transferring the DNA between multiple tubes. Several protocols based on organic extraction of DNA were effectively developed decades ago, though improved and more practical versions of these protocols have also been developed and published in the last years.

The chelex extraction method involves adding the Chelex resin to the sample, boiling the solution, then vortexing and centrifuging it. The cellular materials bind to the Chelex beads, while the DNA is available in the supernatant. The Chelex method is much faster and simpler than organic extraction, and it only requires one tube, which decreases the risk of DNA contamination. Unfortunately, Chelex extraction does not yield as much quantity and the DNA yielded is single-stranded, which means it can only be used for PCR-based analyses and not for RFLP.

Solid phase extraction such as using a spin-column-based extraction method takes advantage of the fact that DNA binds to silica. The sample containing DNA is added to a column containing a silica gel or silica beads and chaotropic salts. The chaotropic salts disrupt the hydrogen bonding between strands and facilitate the binding of the DNA to silica by causing the nucleic acids to become hydrophobic. This exposes the phosphate residues so they are available for adsorption. The DNA binds to the silica, while the rest of the solution is washed out using ethanol to remove chaotropic salts and other unnecessary constituents. The DNA can then be rehydrated with aqueous low-salt solutions allowing for elution of the DNA from the beads.

This method yields high-quality, largely double-stranded DNA which can be used for both PCR and RFLP analysis. This procedure can be automated and has a high throughput, although lower than the phenol-chloroform method. This is a one-step method i.e. the entire procedure is completed in one tube. This lowers the risk of contamination making it very useful for the forensic extraction of DNA. Multiple solid-phase extraction commercial kits are manufactured and marketed by different companies; the only problem is that they are more expensive than organic extraction or Chelex extraction.

== Special types ==
Specific techniques must be chosen for the isolation of DNA from some samples. Typical samples with complicated DNA isolation are:

- archaeological samples containing partially degraded DNA, see ancient DNA
- samples containing inhibitors of subsequent analysis procedures, most notably inhibitors of PCR, such as humic acid from the soil, indigo and other fabric dyes or haemoglobin in blood
- samples from microorganisms with thick cellular walls, for example, yeast
- samples containing mixed DNA from multiple sources

Extrachromosomal DNA is generally easy to isolate, especially plasmids may be easily isolated by cell lysis followed by precipitation of proteins, which traps chromosomal DNA in insoluble fraction and after centrifugation, plasmid DNA can be purified from soluble fraction.

A Hirt DNA Extraction is an isolation of all extrachromosomal DNA in a mammalian cell. The Hirt extraction process gets rid of the high molecular weight nuclear DNA, leaving only low molecular weight mitochondrial DNA and any viral episomes present in the cell.

== Detection of DNA ==
A diphenylamine (DPA) indicator will confirm the presence of DNA. This procedure involves chemical hydrolysis of DNA: when heated (e.g. ≥95 °C) in acid, the reaction requires a deoxyribose sugar and therefore is specific for DNA. Under these conditions, the 2-deoxyribose is converted to w-hydroxylevulinyl aldehyde, which reacts with the compound, diphenylamine, to produce a blue-colored compound. DNA concentration can be determined by measuring the intensity of absorbance of the solution at the 600 nm with a spectrophotometer and comparing to a standard curve of known DNA concentrations.

Measuring the intensity of absorbance of the DNA solution at wavelengths 260 nm and 280 nm is used as a measure of DNA purity. DNA can be quantified by cutting the DNA with a restriction enzyme, running it on an agarose gel, staining with ethidium bromide (EtBr) or a different stain and comparing the intensity of the DNA with a DNA marker of known concentration.

Using the Southern blot technique, this quantified DNA can be isolated and examined further using PCR and RFLP analysis. These procedures allow differentiation of the repeated sequences within the genome. It is these techniques which forensic scientists use for comparison, identification, and analysis.

== High-molecular-weight DNA extraction method ==
In this method, plant nuclei are isolated by physically grinding tissues and reconstituting the intact nuclei in a unique Nuclear Isolation Buffer (NIB). The plastid DNAs are released from organelles and eliminated with an osmotic buffer by washing and centrifugation. The purified nuclei are then lysed and further cleaned by organic extraction, and the genomic DNA is precipitated with a high concentration of CTAB. The highly pure, high molecular weight gDNA is extracted from the nuclei, dissolved in a high pH buffer, allowing for stable long-term storage.

== DNA storage ==
DNA storage is an important aspect of DNA extraction projects as it ensures the integrity and stability of the extracted DNA for downstream applications.

One common method of DNA storage is ethanol precipitation, which involves adding ethanol and a salt, such as sodium chloride or potassium acetate, to the extracted DNA to precipitate it out of solution. The DNA is then pelleted by centrifugation and washed with 70% ethanol to remove any remaining contaminants. The DNA pellet is then air-dried and resuspended in a buffer, such as Tris-EDTA (TE) buffer, for storage.

Another method is freezing the DNA in a buffer such as TE buffer, or in a cryoprotectant such as glycerol or DMSO, at -20 or -80 degrees Celsius. This method preserves the integrity of the DNA and slows down the activity of any enzymes that may degrade it.

It's important to note that the choice of storage buffer and conditions will depend on the downstream application for which the DNA is intended. For example, if the DNA is to be used for PCR, it may be stored in TE buffer at 4 degrees Celsius, while if it is to be used for long-term storage or shipping, it may be stored in ethanol at -20 degrees Celsius. The extracted DNA should be regularly checked for its quality and integrity, such as by running a gel electrophoresis or spectrophotometry. The storage conditions should be also noted and controlled, such as the temperature and humidity.

It's also important to consider the long-term stability of the DNA and the potential for degradation over time. The extracted DNA should be stored for as short a time as possible, and the conditions for storage should be chosen to minimize the risk of degradation.

In general, the extracted DNA should be stored under the best possible conditions to ensure its stability and integrity for downstream applications.

== Quality control ==
There are several quality control techniques used to ensure the quality of extracted DNA, including:

- Spectrophotometry: This is a widely used method for measuring the concentration and purity of a DNA sample. Spectrophotometry measures the absorbance of a sample at different wavelengths, typically at 260 nm and 280 nm. The ratio of absorbance at 260 nm and 280 nm is used to determine the purity of the DNA sample.
- Gel electrophoresis: This technique is used to visualize and compare the size and integrity of DNA samples. The DNA is loaded onto an agarose gel and then subjected to an electric field, which causes the DNA to migrate through the gel. The migration of the DNA can be visualized using ethidium bromide, which intercalates into the DNA and fluoresces under UV light.
- Fluorometry: Fluorometry is a method to determine the concentration of nucleic acids by measuring the fluorescence of the sample when excited by a specific wavelength of light. Fluorometry uses dyes that specifically bind to nucleic acids and have a high fluorescence intensity.
- PCR: Polymerase Chain Reaction (PCR) is a technique that amplifies a specific region of DNA, it is also used as a QC method by amplifying a small fragment of the DNA, if the amplification is successful, it means the extracted DNA is of good quality and it's not degraded.
- Qubit Fluorometer: The Qubit Fluorometer is an instrument that uses fluorescent dyes to measure the concentration of DNA and RNA in a sample. It is a quick and sensitive method that can be used to determine the concentration of DNA samples.
- Bioanalyzer: The bioanalyzer is an instrument that uses electrophoresis to separate and analyze DNA, RNA, and protein samples. It can provide detailed information about the size, integrity, and purity of a DNA sample.

== See also ==
- Boom method
- DNA fingerprinting
- DNA sequencing
- DNA structure
- Ethanol precipitation
- Plasmid preparation
- Polymerase chain reaction
- SCODA DNA purification
