= Solid-phase reversible immobilization =

Solid-phase reversible immobilization, or SPRI, is a method of purifying nucleic acids from solution. It uses silica- or carboxyl-coated paramagnetic beads, which reversibly bind to nucleic acids in the presence of polyethylene glycol and a salt. A common application of SPRI technology is purifying samples of DNA amplified by PCR for sequencing reactions:.

== Use in nucleic acid purification ==
SPRI beads are paramagnetic beads coated with silica or carboxyl groups. When the beads are resuspended in solutions with high concentrations of polyethylene glycol and salts, they are capable of binding reversibly to nucleic acids. This binding is size selective, in that longer polymers of nucleic acids bind more efficiently than shorter ones. A SPRI purification typically includes the following steps:

1. SPRI beads in a solution of polyethylene glycol and sodium chloride are mixed with a sample of nucleic acids. The nucleic acids bind to the beads.
2. The mixture is placed in a magnetic field, which separates the nucleic-acid bound beads from the solution.
3. The solution is removed and the beads are washed multiple times with 80% ethanol in water.
4. The beads are allowed to dry to remove residual ethanol.
5. The beads are removed from the magnetic field and resuspended in water or an elution buffer, which releases the nucleic acids from the beads.
6. The mixture is once again placed in a magnetic field, separating the beads from the solution.
7. The solution, which now contains the purified nucleic acids, is removed and used for downstream applications.

== See also ==
- Nucleic acid methods
- DNA sequencing
- Solid-phase extraction
