= Chelex 100 =

Chelex 100 is a chelating material from Bio-Rad used to purify other compounds via ion exchange. It is noteworthy for its ability to bind transition metal ions.

It is a styrene-divinylbenzene co-polymer containing iminodiacetic acid groups.

A concentrated solution of metals is obtained by eluting the resin with a small volume of 2 M nitric acid, which protonates the iminodiacetate groups.

Chelex resin is often used for DNA extraction in preparation for polymerase chain reaction by binding to cations including Mg^{2+}, which is an essential cofactor for DNases. Chelex protects the sample from DNases that might remain active after the boiling and could subsequently degrade the DNA, rendering it unsuitable for PCR. After boiling, the Chelex-DNA preparation is stable and can be stored at 4°C for 3–4 months. Polar resin beads bind polar cellular components after breaking open cells, while DNA and RNA remain in water solution above the Chelex resin.

However, the heating steps do denature the double helix, and the resulting single-stranded DNA is less stable in storage.
