= DNA separation by silica adsorption =

Method for separation of DNA

DNA separation by silica adsorption is a method of DNA separation that is based on DNA molecules binding to silica surfaces in the presence of certain salts and under certain pH conditions.

== Operations ==
In order to separate DNA through silica adsorption, a sample is first lysed, releasing proteins, DNA, phospholipids, etc. from the cells. The remaining tissue is discarded. The supernatant containing the DNA is then exposed to silica in a solution with high ionic strength. The highest DNA adsorption efficiencies occur in the presence of buffer solution with a pH at or below the pKa of the surface silanol groups.

The mechanism behind DNA adsorption onto silica is not fully understood; one possible explanation involves reduction of the silica surface's negative charge due to the high ionic strength of the buffer. This decrease in surface charge leads to a decrease in the electrostatic repulsion between the negatively charged DNA and the negatively charged silica. Meanwhile, the buffer also reduces the activity of water by formatting hydrated ions. This leads to the silica surface and DNA becoming dehydrated. These conditions lead to an energetically favorable situation for DNA to adsorb to the silica surface.

A further explanation of how DNA binds to silica is based on the action of guanidinium chloride (GuHCl), which acts as a chaotrope. A chaotrope denatures biomolecules by disrupting the shell of hydration around them. This allows positively charged ions to form a salt bridge between the negatively charged silica and the negatively charged DNA backbone in high salt concentration. The DNA can then be washed with high salt and ethanol, and ultimately eluted with low salt.

After the DNA is bound to the silica it is then washed to remove contaminants and finally eluted using an elution buffer or distilled water.

== See also ==
- Spin column-based nucleic acid purification
