= Synchronous coefficient of drag alteration =

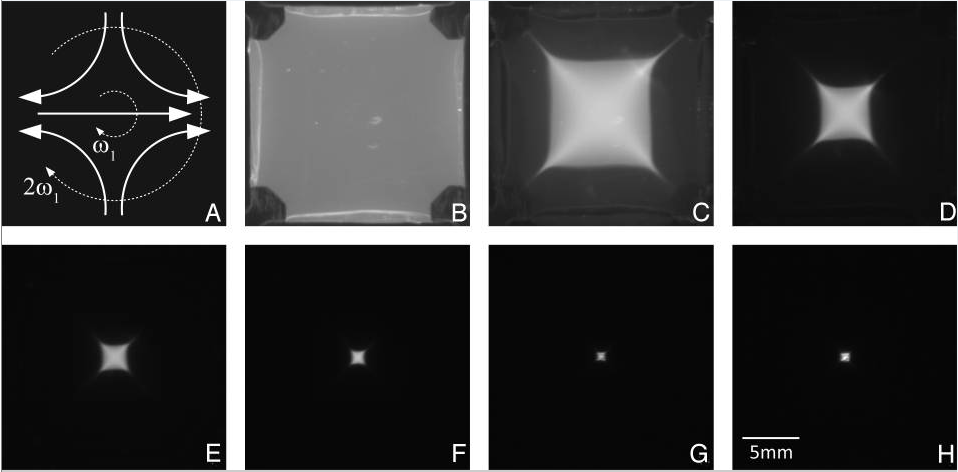
Time-lapse sequence showing SYBR Green I - stained pUC19 DNA (2.7kb) being SCODA concentrated in the center of a 1% agarose gel (where no electrode is present).

Synchronous coefficient of drag alteration (SCODA) is a biotechnology method for purifying, separating and/or concentrating bio-molecules. SCODA has the ability to separate molecules whose mobility (or drag) can be altered in sync with a driving field. This technique has been primarily used for concentrating and purifying DNA, where DNA mobility changes with an applied electrophoretic field. Electrophoretic SCODA has also been demonstrated with RNA and proteins.

== Theory ==
As shown below, the SCODA principle applies to any particle driven by a force field in which the particle's mobility is altered in sync with the driving field.

=== SCODA principle ===
For explanatory purposes consider an electrophoretic particle moving (driven) in an electric field. Let:

$E=\widehat{E}E_0cos(\omega t)$ (1)

and$dv_{x_{cos2\omega}}$

$\overrightarrow{v}(t)=\mu cos(\omega t) \widehat{E}E_0$ (2)

denote an electric field and the velocity of the particle in such a field. If $\mu$ is constant the time average of $\overrightarrow{v}(t)=0$.

If $\mu$ is not constant as a function of time and if $\mu$ has a frequency component proportional to $cos(\omega t)$ the time average of $\overrightarrow{v}(t)$ need not be zero.

Consider the following example:

$\mu(t) = \mu_0 + \mu_1 cos(\omega t)$ (3)

Substituting (3) in (2) and computing the time average, $\bar{\overrightarrow{v}}$, we obtain:

$\bar{\overrightarrow{v}}=\frac{1}{2}\mu_1\widehat{E}E_0$ (4)

Thus, it is possible to have the particle experience a non-zero time average velocity, in other words, a net electrophoretic drift, even when the time average of the applied electric field is zero.

=== Creation of focusing field geometry ===
Consider a particle under a force field that has a velocity parallel to the field direction and a speed proportional to the square of the magnitude of the electric field (any other non-linearity can be employed):

$\overrightarrow{v}=k\widehat{E}(E)^2$ (5)

The effective mobility of the particle (the relationship between small changes in drift velocity $d\overrightarrow{v}$ with respect to small changes in electric field $d\overrightarrow{E}$) can be expressed in Cartesian coordinates as:

$dv_x={\partial v_x \over \partial E_x}dE_x + {\partial v_x \over \partial E_y}dE_y$ (6)

$dv_y={\partial v_y \over \partial E_x}dE_x + {\partial v_y \over \partial E_y}dE_y$ (7)

Combining (5), (6) and (7) we get:

$dv_x = k \Biggl[\Biggl(E+\frac{E^2_x}{E}\Biggr)dE_x + \Biggl(\frac{E_xE_y}{E}\Biggr)dE_y\Biggr]$ (8)

$dv_y = k \Biggl[\Biggl(\frac{E_xE_y}{E}\Biggr)dE_x + \Biggl(E+\frac{E^2_y}{E}\Biggr)dE_y\Biggr]$ (9)

Further consider the field E is applied in a plane and it rotates counter-clockwise at angular frequency $\omega$, such that the field components are:

$E_x = E cos(\omega t)$ (10)

$E_y = E sin (\omega t)$ (11)

Substituting (10) and (11) in (8) and (9) and simplifying using trigonometric identities results in a sum of constant terms, sine and cosine, at angular frequency $2\omega$. The next calculations will be performed such that only the cosine terms at angular frequency $2\omega$ will yield non-zero net drift velocity - therefore we need only evaluate these terms, which will be abbreviated $dv_{x_{cos2\omega}}$ and $dv_{y_{cos2\omega}}$. The following is obtained:

$dv_{x_{cos2\omega}}=\frac{kE}{2}[cos(2\omega t)]dE_x$ (12)

$dv_{y_{cos2\omega}}=\frac{kE}{2}[cos(2\omega t)]dE_y$ (13)

Let $dE_x$ and $dE_y$ take the form of a small quadrupole field of intensity $dE_q$ that varies in a sinusoidal manner proportional to $cos(2\omega t)$ such that:

$dE_x = -dE_qx cos(\omega t)$ (14)

$dE_y = dE_qy cos(\omega t)$ (15)

Substituting (14) and (15) into (12) and (13) and taking the time average we obtain:

$\bar{dv_x} = \bar{dv_{x_{cos2\omega}}}=-\frac{kEdE_q}{4}x$ (16)

$\bar{dv_y} = \bar{dv_{y_{cos2\omega}}}=-\frac{kEdE_q}{4}y$ (17)

which can be summarized in vector notation to:

$\bar{d\overrightarrow{v}}=-\frac{kEdE_q}{4}\overrightarrow{r}$ (18)

Equation (18) shows that for all positions $\overrightarrow{r}$ the time averaged velocity is in the direction toward the origin (concentrating the particles towards the origin), with speed proportional to the mobility coefficient k, the strength of the rotating field E and the strength of the perturbing quadrupole field $dE_q$.

== DNA concentration and purification ==
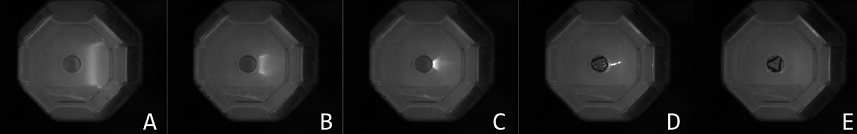
SCODA DNA concentration using the Aurora system. A – injection of DNA sample. B, C, D – purification of DNA sample. In image D the DNA achieves an equilibrium position between the concentrating SCODA force and the DC wash field. E – focused DNA sample ready to be pipetted from the central extraction well.

DNA molecules are unique in that they are long, charged polymers which when in a separation medium, such as agarose gel, can exhibit highly non-linear velocity profiles in response to an electric field. As such, DNA is easily separated from other molecules that are not both charged and strongly non-linear, using SCODA

=== DNA injection ===
To perform SCODA concentration of DNA molecules, the sample must be embedded in the separation media (gel) in locations where the electrophoretic field is of optimal intensity. This initial translocation of the sample into the optimal concentration position is referred to as "injection". The optimal position is determined by the gel geometry and location of the SCODA driving electrodes. Initially the sample is located in a buffer solution in the sample chamber, adjacent to the concentration gel. Injection is achieved by the application of a controlled DC electrophoretic field across the sample chamber which results in all charged particles being transferred into the concentration gel. To obtain a good stacking of the sample (i.e. tight DNA band) multiple methods can be employed. One example is to exploit the conductivity ratio between the sample chamber buffer and the concentration gel buffer. If the sample chamber buffer has a low conductivity and the concentration gel buffer has a high conductivity this results in a sharp drop off in electric field at the gel-buffer interface which promotes stacking.

=== DNA concentration ===
Once the DNA is positioned optimally in the concentration gel the SCODA rotating fields are applied. The frequency of the fields can be tuned such that only specific DNA lengths are concentrated. To prevent boiling during the concentration stage (which may cause Joule heating), the separation medium may be actively cooled. It is also possible to reverse the phase of SCODA fields, so that molecules are de-focused.

=== DNA purification ===
As only particles that exhibit non-linear velocity experience the SCODA concentrating force, small charged particles that respond linearly to electrophoretic fields are not concentrated. These particles instead of spiraling towards the center of the SCODA gel orbit at a constant radius. If a weak DC field is superimposed on the SCODA rotating fields these particles will be "washed" off from the SCODA gel resulting in highly pure DNA remaining in the gel center.

=== DNA extraction ===
The SCODA DNA force results in the DNA sample concentrating in the center of the SCODA gel. To extract the DNA an extraction well can be pre-formed in the gel and filled with buffer. As the DNA does not experience non-linear mobility in buffer it accumulates in the extraction well. At the end of the concentration and purification stage the sample can then be pipetted out from this well.

== Applications ==
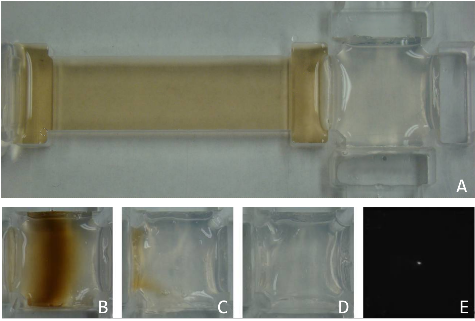
A - highly contaminated sample before being injected into the SCODA gel. B - SCODA gel after injection. C - SCODA gel during purification process. D - SCODA gel at the end of the purification process (no visible contaminants). E - Fluorescent image of SCODA gel from picture D showing stained DNA in the center of the SCODA gel.

=== High molecular weight DNA purification ===
The electrophoretic SCODA force is gentle enough to maintain the integrity of high molecular weight DNA as it is concentrated towards the center of the SCODA gel. Depending on the length of the DNA in the sample different protocols can be used to concentrate DNA over 1 Mb in length.

=== Contaminated DNA purification ===
DNA concentration and purification has been achieved directly from tar sands samples resuspended in buffer using the SCODA technique. DNA sequencing was subsequently performed and tentatively over 200 distinct bacterial genomes have been identified. SCODA has also been used for purification of DNA from many other environmental sources.

=== Sequence-specific ===
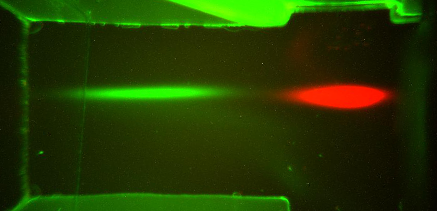
Mutant DNA (green) is being separated from wild type DNA (red) during sequence specific SCODA.

The non-linear mobility of DNA in gel can be further controlled by embedding in the SCODA gel DNA oligonucleotides complementary to DNA fragments in the sample. This then results in highly specific non-linear velocities for the sample DNA that matches the gel-embedded DNA. This artificial specific non-linearity is then used to selectively concentrate only sequences of interest while rejecting all other DNA sequences in the sample. Over 1,000,000-fold enrichment of single nucleotide variants over wild-type have been demonstrated.

An application of this technique is the detection of rare tumour-derived DNA (ctDNA) from blood samples.

== See also ==
- DNA extraction
- Ethanol precipitation
- Phenol-chloroform extraction
- Spin column-based purification
