= Nucleic acid quantitation =

Process in molecular biology

Optical density of ribosome sample. The important wavelengths of 260nm and 280nm are labeled.

In molecular biology, quantitation of nucleic acids is commonly performed to determine the average concentrations of DNA or RNA present in a mixture, as well as their purity. Reactions that use nucleic acids often require particular amounts and purity for optimum performance. To date, there are two main approaches used by scientists to quantitate, or establish the concentration, of nucleic acids (such as DNA or RNA) in a solution. These are spectrophotometric quantification and UV fluorescence tagging in presence of a DNA dye.

== Spectrophotometric analysis ==
One of the most commonly used practices to quantitate DNA or RNA is the use of spectrophotometric analysis using a spectrophotometer. A spectrophotometer is able to determine the average concentrations of the nucleic acids DNA or RNA present in a mixture, as well as their purity.

Spectrophotometric analysis is based on the principles that nucleic acids absorb ultraviolet light in a specific pattern. In the case of DNA and RNA, a sample is exposed to ultraviolet light at a wavelength of 260 nanometres (nm) and a photo-detector measures the light that passes through the sample. Some of the ultraviolet light will pass through and some will be absorbed by the DNA / RNA. The more light absorbed by the sample, the higher the nucleic acid concentration in the sample. The resulting effect is that less light will strike the photodetector and this will produce a higher optical density (OD)

Using the Beer–Lambert law it is possible to relate the amount of light absorbed to the concentration of the absorbing molecule. At a wavelength of 260 nm, the average extinction coefficient for double-stranded DNA (dsDNA) is 0.020 (μg/mL)^{−1} cm^{−1}, for single-stranded DNA (ssDNA) it is 0.027 (μg/mL)^{−1} cm^{−1}, for single-stranded RNA (ssRNA) it is 0.025 (μg/mL)^{−1} cm^{−1} and for short single-stranded oligonucleotides it is dependent on the length and base composition. Thus, an Absorbance (A) of 1 corresponds to a concentration of 50 μg/mL for double-stranded DNA. This method of calculation is valid for up to an A of at least 2. A more accurate extinction coefficient may be needed for oligonucleotides; these can be predicted using the nearest-neighbor model.

=== Calculations ===
The optical density (OD) is generated from equation:

Optical density= Log (Intensity of incident light / Intensity of Transmitted light)

In practical terms, a sample that contains no DNA or RNA should not absorb any of the ultraviolet light and therefore produce an OD of 0

Optical density= Log (100/100)=0

When using spectrophotometric analysis to determine the concentration of DNA or RNA, the Beer–Lambert law is used to determine unknown concentrations without the need for standard curves. In essence, the Beer Lambert Law makes it possible to relate the amount of light absorbed to the concentration of the absorbing molecule. The following absorbance units to nucleic acid concentration conversion factors are used to convert OD to concentration of unknown nucleic acid samples:

A260 dsDNA = 50 μg/mL

A260 ssDNA = 33 μg/mL

A260 ssRNA = 40 μg/mL

=== Conversion factors ===
When using a 10 mm path length, simply multiply the OD by the conversion factor to determine the concentration. Example, a 2.0 OD dsDNA sample corresponds to a sample with a 100 μg/mL concentration.

When using a path length that is shorter than 10mm, the resultant OD will be reduced by a factor of 10/path length. Using the example above with a 3 mm path length, the OD for the 100 μg/mL sample would be reduced to 0.6. To normalize the concentration to a 10mm equivalent, the following is done:

0.6 OD X (10/3) * 50 μg/mL=100 μg/mL

Most spectrophotometers allow selection of the nucleic acid type and path length such that resultant concentration is normalized to the 10 mm path length which is based on the principles of Beer's law.

=== A260 as quantity measurement ===
The "A260 unit" is used as a quantity measure for nucleic acids. One A260 unit is the amount of nucleic acid contained in 1 mL and producing an OD of 1. The same conversion factors apply, and therefore, in such contexts:

1 A260 unit dsDNA = 50 μg
1 A260 unit ssDNA = 33 μg
1 A260 unit ssRNA = 40 μg

=== Sample purity (260:280 / 260:230 ratios) ===
It is common for nucleic acid samples to be contaminated with other molecules (i.e. proteins, organic compounds, other). The secondary benefit of using spectrophotometric analysis for nucleic acid quantitation is the ability to determine sample purity using the 260 nm:280 nm calculation. The ratio of the absorbance at 260 and 280 nm (A_{260/280}) is used to assess the purity of nucleic acids. For pure DNA, A_{260/280} is widely considered ~1.8 but has been argued to translate - due to numeric errors in the original Warburg paper - into a mix of 60% protein and 40% DNA. The ratio for pure RNA A_{260/280} is ~2.0. These ratios are commonly used to assess the amount of protein contamination that is left from the nucleic acid isolation process since proteins absorb at 280 nm.

The ratio of absorbance at 260 nm vs 280 nm is commonly used to assess DNA contamination of protein solutions, since proteins (in particular, the aromatic amino acids) absorb light at 280 nm. The reverse, however, is not true — it takes a relatively large amount of protein contamination to significantly affect the 260:280 ratio in a nucleic acid solution.

260:280 ratio has high sensitivity for nucleic acid contamination in protein:

% protein	% nucleic acid	260:280 ratio
100	0	0.57
95	5	1.06
90	10	1.32
70	30	1.73

260:280 ratio lacks sensitivity for protein contamination in nucleic acids (table shown for RNA, 100% DNA is approximately 1.8):

% nucleic acid	% protein	260:280 ratio
100	0	2.00
95	5	1.99
90	10	1.98
70	30	1.94

This difference is due to the much higher mass attenuation coefficient nucleic acids have at 260 nm and 280 nm, compared to that of proteins. Because of this, even for relatively high concentrations of protein, the protein contributes relatively little to the 260 and 280 absorbance. While the protein contamination cannot be reliably assessed with a 260:280 ratio, this also means that it contributes little error to DNA quantity estimation.

==== Contamination identification ====
Examination of sample spectra may be useful in identifying that a problem with sample purity exists.

Table of potential contamination factors
Ratio	Low reading	High reading
A260/A230	Carbohydrate carryover (often a problem with plants); Residual phenol from nucleic acid extraction; Residual guanidine (often used in column-based kits); Glycogen used for precipitation.	Making a blank measurement on a dirty pedestal.; Using an inappropriate solution for the blank measurement. The blank solution should be the same pH and of a similar ionic strength as the sample solution. Example: using water for the blank measurement for samples dissolved in TE may result in low 260/230 ratios.
A260/A280	Residual phenol or other reagent associated with the extraction protocol.; A very low concentration (< 10 ng/μL) of nucleic acid.	Residual RNA from nucleic acid extraction.; * High 260/280 purity ratios are not normally indicative of any issues.

==== Other common contaminants ====
- Contamination by phenol, which is commonly used in nucleic acid purification, can significantly throw off quantification estimates. Phenol absorbs with a peak at 270 nm and a A_{260/280} of 1.2. Nucleic acid preparations uncontaminated by phenol should have a A_{260/280} of around 2. Contamination by phenol can significantly contribute to overestimation of DNA concentration.
- Absorption at 230 nm can be caused by contamination by phenolate ion, thiocyanates, and other organic compounds. For a pure RNA sample, the A_{230:260:280} should be around 1:2:1, and for a pure DNA sample, the A_{230:260:280} should be around 1:1.8:1.
- Absorption at 330 nm and higher indicates particulates contaminating the solution, causing scattering of light in the visible range. The value in a pure nucleic acid sample should be zero.
- Negative values could result if an incorrect solution was used as blank. Alternatively, these values could arise due to fluorescence of a dye in the solution.

== Analysis with fluorescent dye tagging ==
An alternative method to assess DNA and RNA concentration is to tag the sample with a Fluorescent tag, which is a fluorescent dye used to measure the intensity of the dyes that bind to nucleic acids and selectively fluoresce when bound (e.g. Ethidium bromide). This method is useful for cases where concentration is too low to accurately assess with spectrophotometry and in cases where contaminants absorbing at 260 nm make accurate quantitation by that method impossible. The benefit of fluorescence quantitation of DNA and RNA is the improved sensitivity over spectrophotometric analysis. Although, that increase in sensitivity comes at the cost of a higher price per sample and a lengthier sample preparation process.

There are two main ways to approach this. "Spotting" involves placing a sample directly onto an agarose gel or plastic wrap. The fluorescent dye is either present in the agarose gel, or is added in appropriate concentrations to the samples on the plastic film. A set of samples with known concentrations are spotted alongside the sample. The concentration of the unknown sample is then estimated by comparison with the fluorescence of these known concentrations. Alternatively, one may run the sample through an agarose or polyacrylamide gel, alongside some samples of known concentration. As with the spot test, concentration is estimated through comparison of fluorescent intensity with the known samples.

If the sample volumes are large enough to use microplates or cuvettes, the dye-loaded samples can also be quantified with a fluorescence photometer. Minimum sample volume starts at 0.3 μL.

To date there is no fluorescence method to determine protein contamination of a DNA sample that is similar to the 260 nm/280 nm spectrophotometric version.

== See also ==
- Nucleic acid methods
- Phenol–chloroform extraction
- Column purification
- Protein methods
