= Random hexamer =

A random hexamer or random hexonucleotides are for various PCR applications such as rolling circle amplification to prime the DNA.

They are oligonucleotide sequences of 6 bases which are synthesised entirely randomly to give a numerous range of sequences that have the potential to anneal at many random points on a DNA sequence and act as a primer to commence first strand cDNA synthesis.
