= RNA extraction =

Purification of RNA from biological samples

RNA extraction is the purification of RNA from biological samples. This procedure is complicated by the ubiquitous presence of ribonuclease enzymes in cells and tissues, which can rapidly degrade RNA. Several methods are used in molecular biology to isolate RNA from samples, the most common of these is guanidinium thiocyanate-phenol-chloroform extraction. Usually, the phenol-chloroform solution used for RNA extraction has lower pH, this aids in separating DNA from RNA and leads to a more pure RNA preparation. The filter paper based lysis and elution method features high throughput capacity.

RNA extraction in liquid nitrogen, commonly using a mortar and pestle (or specialized steel devices known as tissue pulverizers) is also useful in preventing ribonuclease activity.

== RNase contamination ==
The extraction of RNA in molecular biology experiments is greatly complicated by the presence of ubiquitous and hardy RNases that degrade RNA samples. Certain RNases can be extremely hardy and inactivating them is difficult compared to neutralizing DNases. In addition to the cellular RNases that are released there are several RNases that are present in the environment. RNases have evolved to have many extracellular functions in various organisms. For example, RNase 7, a member of the RNase A superfamily, is secreted by human skin and serves as a potent antipathogen defence. For these secreted RNases, enzymatic activity may not even be necessary for the RNase's exapted function. For example, immune RNases act by destabilizing the cell membranes of bacteria.

To counter this, equipment used for RNA extraction is usually cleaned thoroughly, kept separate from common lab equipment and treated with various harsh chemicals that destroy RNases. This includes solutions that are used for RNA extraction, which can be treated with chemicals such as DEPC. For the same reason, experimenters take special care not to let their bare skin touch the equipment, to avoid contaminating the sample with RNAses that are present on human skin. Broad RNAse inhibitors are also commercially available and sometimes added to in vitro transcription (RNA synthesis) reactions.

== See also ==
- Column purification
- DNA extraction
- Ethanol precipitation
- Phenol-chloroform extraction
