= Lysis =

Breaking down of the membrane of a cell

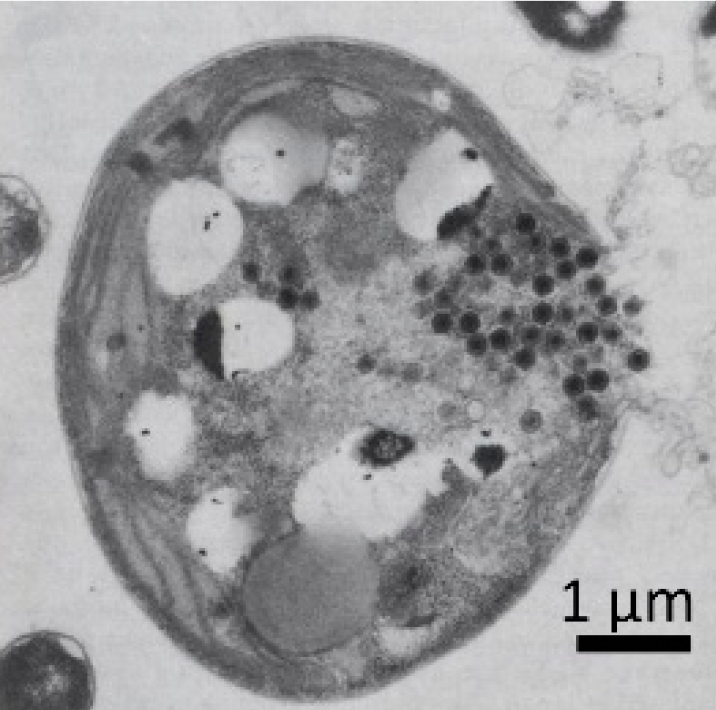
Lysis of a chlorella algae cell membrane and cell wall following infection with the chlorovirus Paramecium bursaria chlorella virus 1

Lysis (/ˈlaɪsɪs/ LY-sis; from Greek λῠ́σῐς lýsis 'loosening') is the breaking down of the membrane of a cell, often by viral, enzymic, or osmotic (that is, "lytic" /ˈlɪtɪk/ LIT-ik) mechanisms that compromise its integrity. A fluid containing the contents of lysed cells is called a lysate. In molecular biology, biochemistry, and cell biology laboratories, cell cultures may be subjected to lysis in the process of purifying their components, as in protein purification, DNA extraction, RNA extraction, or in purifying organelles.

Many species of bacteria are subject to lysis by the enzyme lysozyme, found in animal saliva, egg white, and other secretions. Phage lytic enzymes (lysins) produced during bacteriophage infection are responsible for the ability of these viruses to lyse bacterial cells. Penicillin and related β-lactam antibiotics cause the death of bacteria through enzyme-mediated lysis that occurs after the drug causes the bacterium to form a defective cell wall. If the cell wall is completely lost and the penicillin was used on gram-positive bacteria, then the bacterium is referred to as a protoplast, but if penicillin was used on gram-negative bacteria, then it is called a spheroplast.

== Cytolysis ==
Cytolysis occurs when a cell bursts due to an osmotic imbalance that has caused excess water to move into the cell.

Cytolysis can be prevented by several different mechanisms, including the contractile vacuole that exists in some paramecia, which rapidly pump water out of the cell. Cytolysis does not occur under normal conditions in plant cells because plant cells have a strong cell wall that contains the osmotic pressure, or turgor pressure, that would otherwise cause cytolysis to occur.

== Oncolysis ==
Oncolysis is the destruction of neoplastic cells or of a tumour.

The term is also used to refer to the reduction of any swelling.

== Plasmolysis ==
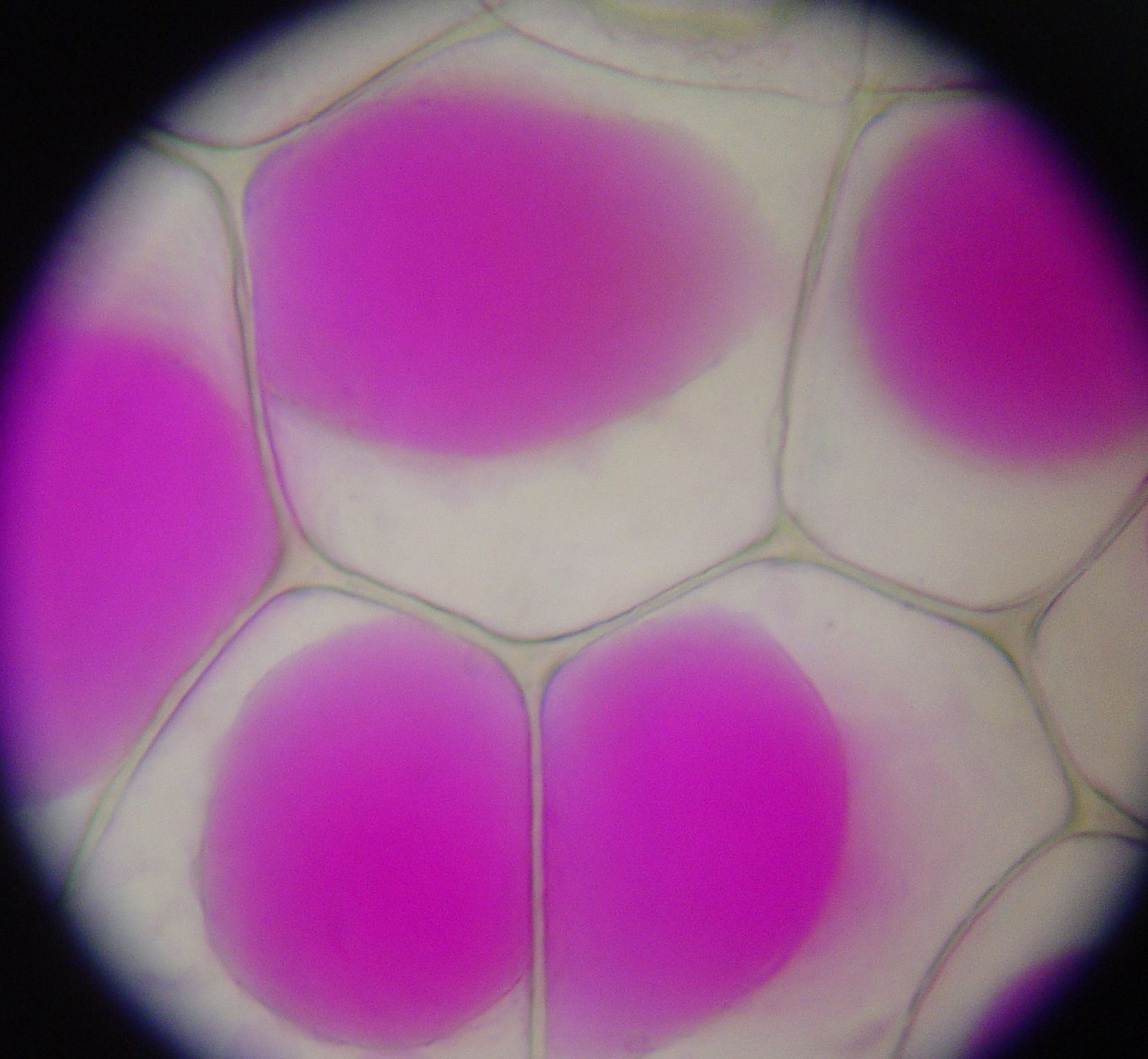
Plasmolysis

Plasmolysis is the contraction of cells within plants due to the loss of water through osmosis. In a hypertonic environment, the cell membrane peels off the cell wall and the vacuole collapses. These cells will eventually wilt and die unless the flow of water caused by osmosis can stop the contraction of the cell membrane.

== Immune response ==
Erythrocytes' hemoglobin release free radicals in response to pathogens when lysed by them. This can damage the pathogens.

== Applications ==
Cell lysis is used in laboratories to break open cells and purify or further study their contents. Lysis in the laboratory may be affected by enzymes or detergents or other chaotropic agents. Mechanical disruption of cell membranes, as by repeated freezing and thawing, sonication, pressure, or filtration may also be referred to as lysis. Many laboratory experiments are sensitive to the choice of lysis mechanism; often it is desirable to avoid mechanical shear forces that would denature or degrade sensitive macromolecules, such as proteins and DNA, and different types of detergents can yield different results. The unprocessed solution immediately after lysis but before any further extraction steps is often referred to as a crude lysate.

For example, lysis is used in western and Southern blotting to analyze the composition of specific proteins, lipids, and nucleic acids individually or as complexes. Depending on the detergent used, either all or some membranes are lysed. For example, if only the cell membrane is lysed then gradient centrifugation can be used to collect certain organelles. Lysis is also used for protein purification, DNA extraction, and RNA extraction.

== Methods ==
Several methods for cell lysis exist, sometimes used in combination. Examples include liquid homogenization, freeze thawing, and physical disruption such as sonication, or the use of hypotonic solutions that cause osmotic swelling and eventual bursting of the cell.

=== Chemical lysis ===
This method uses chemical disruption. It is the most popular and simple approach. Chemical lysis chemically deteriorates/solubilizes the proteins and lipids present within the membrane of targeted cells. Common lysis buffers contain sodium hydroxide (NaOH) and sodium dodecyl sulfate (SDS). Cell lysis is best done at a pH range of 11.5–12.5. Although simple, it is a slow process, taking anywhere from 6 to 12 hours.

=== Acoustic lysis ===
This method uses ultrasonic waves to generate areas of high and low pressure which causes cavitation and in turn, cell lysis. Though this method usually comes out clean, it fails to be cost effective and consistent.

=== Mechanical lysis ===
This method uses physical penetration to pierce or cut a cell membrane.

=== Enzymatic lysis ===
This method uses enzymes such as lysozyme or proteases to disintegrate the cell membrane.

== See also ==
- Cell disruption
- Cell unroofing
- Crenation
- Hemolysis
- Lysogenic
- Pitted keratolysis
