= Ethanol precipitation =

Method of concentrating DNA

Ethanol precipitation is a method used to purify and/or concentrate RNA, DNA, and polysaccharides such as pectin and xyloglucan from aqueous solutions by adding salt and ethanol as an antisolvent.

In DNA extraction, after separating DNA from other cell constituents in water, DNA is precipitated out of solution by neutralizing it with positively charged ions. The addition of ethanol to the solution is necessary to reduce the polarity of the solvent and allow the positively charged ions to interact with the negatively charged phosphate groups of DNA.

== DNA precipitation ==
=== Theory ===
The first hydration shell of a sodium ion dissolved in water

DNA is typically separated from other cell constituents in a two-phase solution of phenol and water. Due to its highly charged phosphate backbone DNA is polar and will concentrate in the water phase while lipids and proteins will concentrate in the phenol phase.

To precipitate the DNA out of the water, the negatively charged phosphate groups of the DNA backbone are neutralized by the addition of positively charged ions from a salt. But because of the high polarity of water, illustrated by its high dielectric constant of 80.1 (at 20 °C), the positively charged ions are shielded and unable to interact with and neutralize the negatively charged phosphate groups of DNA.

This relation is reflected in Coulomb's law, which can be used to calculate the force acting on two charges $q_1$ and $q_2$ separated by a distance $r$ by using the dielectric constant $\varepsilon_r$ (also called relative static permittivity) of the medium in the denominator of the equation ($\varepsilon_0$ is an electric constant):

$F = \frac{1}{4\pi\varepsilon_r\varepsilon_0} \frac{q_1 q_2}{r^2}$

At an atomic level, the reduction in the force acting on a charge results from water molecules forming a hydration shell around it. This fact makes water a very good solvent for charged compounds like salts.

Ethanol is much less polar than water, with a dielectric constant of 24.3 (at 25 °C). This means that adding ethanol to a solution disrupts the screening of charges by water. If enough ethanol is added, the electrical attraction between phosphate groups and any positive ions present in solution becomes strong enough to form stable ionic bonds causing DNA to precipitate out of the solution. This usually happens when ethanol composes over 64% of the solution. As the mechanism suggests, the solution has to contain positive ions for precipitation to occur; usually Na^{+}, NH_{4}^{+} or Li^{+} plays this role .

=== Practice ===
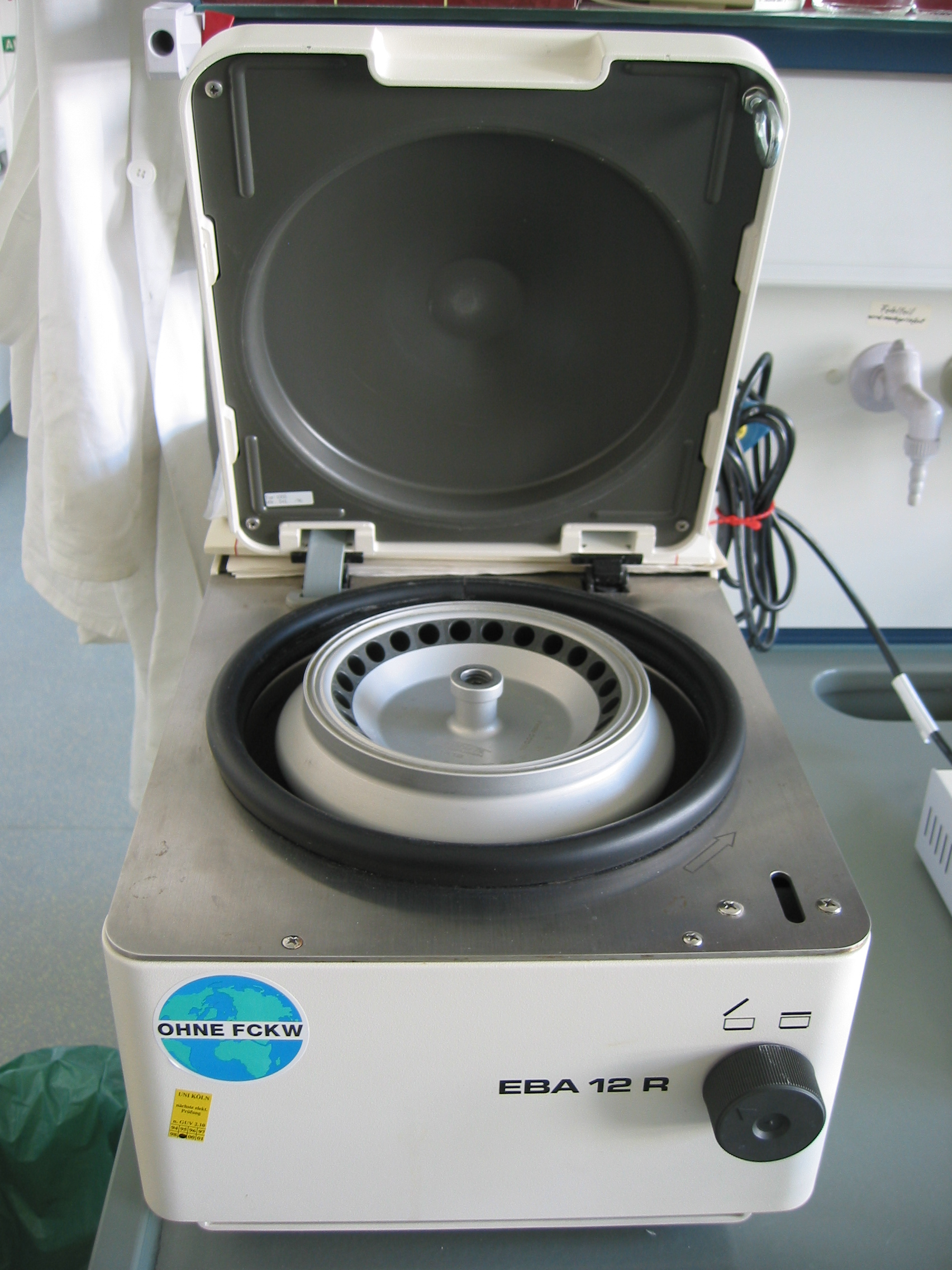
A laboratory tabletop centrifuge

DNA is precipitated by first ensuring that the correct concentration of positive ions is present in solution (too much will result in a lot of salt co-precipitating with DNA, too little will result in incomplete DNA recovery) and then adding two to three volumes of at least 95% ethanol. Many protocols advise storing DNA at low temperature at this point, but there are also observations that it may not improve DNA recovery, and may even lower precipitation efficiency while using over-night incubation time. Therefore, good efficiency can be achieved at room temperature, but when possible degradation is taken into account, it is probably better to incubate DNA on wet ice. Optimal incubation time depends on the length and concentration of DNA. Smaller fragments and lower concentrations will require longer times to achieve acceptable recovery. For very small lengths and low concentrations over-night incubation is recommended.

During incubation DNA and some salts will precipitate from solution, in the next step this precipitate is collected by centrifugation in a microcentrifuge tube at high speeds (~12,000g). Time and speed of centrifugation has the biggest effect on DNA recovery rates. Again smaller fragments and higher dilutions require longer and faster centrifugation. Centrifugation can be done either at room temperature or in 4 °C or 0 °C. During centrifugation precipitated DNA has to move through ethanol solution to the bottom of the tube, lower temperatures increase viscosity of the solution and larger volumes make the distance longer, so both those factors lower efficiency of this process requiring longer centrifugation for the same effect. After centrifugation the supernatant solution is removed, leaving a pellet of crude DNA. Whether the pellet is visible depends on the amount of DNA and on its purity (dirtier pellets are easier to see) or the use of co-precipitants. Use of carriers like tRNA, glycogen or linear polyacrylamide can greatly improve recovery as they make it easier to visually see the pellet of DNA.

In the next step, 70% ethanol is added to the pellet, and it is gently mixed to break the pellet loose and wash it. This removes some of the salts present in the leftover supernatant and bound to DNA pellet making the final DNA cleaner. This suspension is centrifuged again to once again pellet DNA and the supernatant solution is removed. This step is repeated once.

Finally, the pellet is air-dried and the DNA is resuspended in water or other desired buffer. It is important not to over-dry the pellet as it may lead to denaturation of DNA and make it harder to resuspend.

Isopropanol can also be used instead of ethanol; the precipitation efficiency of the isopropanol is higher making one volume enough for precipitation. However, isopropanol is less volatile than ethanol and needs more time to air-dry in the final step. The pellet might also adhere less tightly to the tube when using isopropanol.

== See also ==
- DNA extraction
- Phenol–chloroform extraction
- Salting in
- Salting out
- SCODA DNA purification
- Spin column-based nucleic acid purification
