= Phenol–chloroform extraction =

Extraction technique in molecular biology

Phenol–chloroform extraction is a liquid-liquid extraction technique in molecular biology used to separate nucleic acids from proteins and lipids.

== Process ==
Aqueous samples, lysed cells, or homogenised tissue are mixed with equal volumes of a phenol:chloroform mixture. This mixture is then centrifuged. Because the phenol:chloroform mixture is immiscible with water, the centrifuge will cause two distinct phases to form: an upper aqueous phase, and a lower organic phase. The aqueous phase rises to the top because it is less dense than the organic phase containing the phenol:chloroform. This difference in density is why phenol, which only has a slightly higher density than water, must be mixed with chloroform to form a mixture with a much higher density than water.

The hydrophobic lipids will partition into the lower organic phase, and the proteins will remain at the interphase between the two phases, while the nucleic acids (as well as other contaminants such as salts, sugars, etc.) remain in the upper aqueous phase. The upper aqueous phase can then be pipetted off. Care must be taken to avoid pipetting any of the organic phase or material at the interface. This procedure is often performed multiple times to increase the purity of the DNA. This procedure yields large double stranded DNA that can be used in PCR or RFLP.

If the mixture is acidic, DNA will precipitate into the organic phase while RNA remains in the aqueous phase. This is because DNA is more readily neutralized than RNA.

There are some disadvantages of this technique in forensic use. It is time-consuming and uses hazardous reagents. Also, because it is a two-step process involving transfer of reagents between tubes, it is at a greater risk of contamination.

== See also ==
- Acid guanidinium thiocyanate-phenol-chloroform extraction
- Ethanol precipitation
- Spin column-based nucleic acid purification
