= Spin column-based nucleic acid purification =

Method of purifying nucleic acids

Silica in a spin column with water and with DNA sample in chaotropic buffer

Spin column-based nucleic acid purification is a solid phase extraction method to quickly purify nucleic acids. This method relies on the fact that nucleic acid will bind to the solid phase of silica under certain conditions.

== Procedure ==
The different stages of the method are lyse, bind, wash, and elute. More specifically, this entails the lysis of target cells to release nucleic acids, selective binding of nucleic acid to a silica membrane, washing away particulates and inhibitors that are not bound to the silica membrane, and elution of the nucleic acid, with the end result being purified nucleic acid in an aqueous solution.

For lysis, the cells (blood, tissue, etc.) of the sample must undergo a treatment to break the cell membrane and free the nucleic acid. Depending on the target material, this can include the use of detergent or other buffers, proteinases or other enzymes, heating to various times/temperatures, or mechanical disruption such as cutting with a knife or homogenizer, using a mortar and pestle, or bead-beating with a bead mill.

For binding, a buffer solution is then added to the lysed sample along with ethanol or isopropanol. The sample in binding solution is then transferred to a spin column, and the column is put either in a centrifuge or attached to a vacuum. The centrifuge/vacuum forces the solution through a silica membrane that is inside the spin column, where under the right ionic conditions, nucleic acids will bind to the silica membrane, as the rest of the solution passes through. With the target material bound, the flow-through can be removed.

To wash, a new buffer is added onto the column, then centrifuged/vacuumed through the membrane. This buffer is intended to maintain binding conditions, while removing the binding salts and other remaining contaminants. Generally it takes several washes, often with increasing percentages of ethanol/isopropanol, until the nucleic acid on the silica membrane is free of contaminants. The last 'wash' is often a dry step to allow the alcohol to evaporate, leaving only purified nucleic acids bound to the column.

Finally, elution is the process of adding an aqueous solution to the column, allowing the hydrophilic nucleic acid to leave the column and return to solution. This step may be improved with salt, pH, time, or heat. Finally, to capture the eluate/eluent, the column is transferred into a clean microtube prior to a last centrifugation step.

== Related methods ==
Even prior to the nucleic acid methods employed today, it was known that in the presence of chaotropic agents, such as sodium iodide or sodium perchlorate, DNA binds to silica, glass particles or to unicellular algae called diatoms which shield their cell walls with silica. This property was used to purify nucleic acid using glass powder or silica beads under alkaline conditions. This was later improved using guanidinium thiocyanate or guanidinium hydrochloride as the chaotropic agent. For ease of handling, the use of glass beads was later changed to silica columns. And to enable use of automated extraction instruments, there was development of silica-coated paramagnetic beads, more commonly referred to as "magnetic bead" extraction.

== See also ==
- DNA separation by silica adsorption
- Guanidinium thiocyanate-phenol-chloroform extraction
- Ethanol precipitation
- SCODA DNA purification
- Plasmid preparation
