= Lyotropy =

Lyotropy (from lyo- "dissolve" and -tropic "change") refers to concentration-dependent physical effects in solutions and often more specifically to ion-specific behavior in aqueous solutions.

== History ==
Ions in an aqueous solutions display ion specific behavior that has been commonly exemplified by the Hofmeister series. Stemming from observations by Franz Hofmeister in the 1870s with egg white lysozyme, lyotropic effects led to a classification of ions on their abilities to salt in or salt out proteins.

Because of the positive charge of lysozyme, the original series turned out to be different than the series for most proteins. Thus, the series can change depending on the protein in solution and the concentrations of the ions in solution. Lyotropy- like the Hofmeister series- classifies ions and their abilities to salt in/ salt out proteins.

In 1936, Voet investigated lyotropic behavior to quantify the effects of salt action on molecules and predict the behavior using mathematical models. Using agar and gelatin, he formulated an equation to predict the salting-out action of different ions for other colloids. Lyotropic numbers, N_{lyo}, based on this work appear to be related to the charge density of the ions.

Lyotropic activity also influences swelling of gels, surface tension, rate of saponification processes, viscosity of salt solutions, and heats of hydration.

== Ion pairing equilibria ==
The current understanding of ion-pairing equilibria in an aqueous environment can also be traced to the Eigen-Tamm model that introduced the use of two equilibria states for ion pairs: the contact ion pair (CIP, ion pairs in close contact) and the separated ion pair (SIP, ion pairs separated from each other). As an early application of ion-pairing equilibria, Kester and Pytkowicz studied the role of sulfate and divalent cation ion-pairing in seawater.

This ion-specific behavior was also elucidated through Collin's Law of Matching Water Affinities that describes the strength of ion-pairing in terms of ion size and counterion, while also incorporating coordination state and entropy. Modern computational approaches to simulation of ion-pairing involve molecular dynamic simulations and ab initio calculations that often incorporate polarizable continuum solvent models.

== Implications ==
Following the law of matching water affinities, chaotrope-chaotrope and kosmotrope-kosmotrope ion pairs prefer the CIP state; whereas, chaotrope-kosmotrope ion pairs prefer SIP or unpaired states. Another important lyotropic effect is the pairing of ions to charged headgroups of biological molecules. Vlachy et al. proposed that from chaotropic to kosmotropic headgroups, the ordering follows carboxylate, sulfate and sulfonate groups. In this context, a sodium ion (Na+) will prefer a carboxylate, and a potassium ion (K+) will prefer a sulfonate, which has important partitioning effects in biological systems. Protein solubility depends on pH and salt concentration, where small changes in the local environment can lead to Hofmeister series reversals.

In aqueous solutions of glycans, lyotropic ion-pairing effects often dominate molecular interactions by controlling salt-bridge binding. Modern computational approaches in salt-bridge formation in proteins demonstrate mechanisms underlying the favorable arginine-arginine pairing that is due to reduction in electrostatic repulsion due to pi-stacking interactions.

In carbohydrates, electrostatic and ion pairing are the dominant mechanisms for molecular interactions. Modern computational approaches in salt bridge formation in protein demonstrate that the favorable arginine-arginine pairing (i.e. conserved arginine) is due to reduction in electrostatic repulsion.

== Electrolyotropy ==
Electrolyotropy incorporates Donnan-potential spatial gradients and ion-specific pairing, and is used to determine the distribution of the ions and electric potential by modeling charges as being either fixed or free. A canonical example is a surface-tethered polyelectrolyte brush with a variety of different fixed charged groups interacting with free ions and ion-pairs to minimize Gibbs free energy.

Using streaming current measurements in a microslit electrokinetic system (MES), electrolyotropic theory can be used to determine stoichiometric dissociation constants of ion pairing. This approach proves useful in characterizing complex polyelectrolytes and mixtures of ions in solutions like those found in biological systems. In fact, pH and salt concentrations directly affect stoichiometric dissociation constants. Application of electrolyotropic theory has been proposed as a model of mucosal tissue.
