= Ion network =

Ionic structure in solution

An ion network is an interconnected network or structure composed of ions in a solution. The term "ion network" was coined by Cho and coworkers in 2014. The notion of extended ion aggregates in electrolyte solutions, however, can be found in an earlier report. The ion network is particularly relevant in high-salt solutions where ions can aggregate and interact strongly and it has been investigated in an increasing number of research and review articles.

In high-salt solutions, ions can form clusters or aggregates due to their electrostatic interactions. These aggregates may further organize into spatially more extensive networks, where ions are connected through electrostatic forces and possibly other types of interactions, such as hydrogen bonding.

The formation of percolating ion networks can significantly affect the surrounding solvent molecules, particularly the water hydrogen-bonding networks in aqueous solutions that become intertwined with morphologically complementary ion networks. The presence of ion networks can disrupt the hydrogen-bonding network of water molecules, altering the structure and properties of the solution. This disruption in water structure may have implications for various phenomena, including solvation dynamics, ion transport, and chemical reactions occurring in the solution.

Overall, the concept of an ion network highlights the complex and dynamic interactions between ions and solvent molecules in solution, and its understanding is crucial for elucidating the behavior of electrolyte solutions in various contexts, ranging from biological systems to industrial processes, including lithium-ion batteries.

== Research ==
The study of ion networks and their implications in solution chemistry is an active and interdisciplinary field that has attracted attention from researchers across various disciplines, including chemistry, physics, materials science, and biology. Here are some key research subjects and activities in this field:

- Electrolyte Solutions and Ionic Liquids: Electrolyte solutions, which contain dissolved ions, and ionic liquids, which are essentially molten salts at room temperature, are important systems for studying ion networks. Researchers have investigated the structure and dynamics of ion networks in these systems using a variety of experimental and theoretical techniques.
- Molecular Dynamics (MD) Simulations: Molecular dynamics simulations play a crucial role in understanding ion networks at the molecular level. By simulating the behavior of individual ions and solvent molecules over time, researchers can explore the formation, structure, and dynamics of ion networks in solution.
- Spectroscopic Techniques: Experimental techniques such as infrared spectroscopy, nuclear magnetic resonance (NMR) spectroscopy, and X-ray scattering are commonly used to study ion networks in solution. These techniques provide valuable information about the structure, composition, and dynamics of ion networks.
- Hofmeister Effect: The Hofmeister effect refers to the phenomenon where the addition of specific ions to a solution can significantly alter the solubility, stability, and other properties of solutes. Understanding the Hofmeister effect is essential for elucidating the role of ion networks in solution chemistry.
- Soft Matter Physics: Ion networks in solution are also of interest in the field of soft matter physics, where researchers study the behavior of complex fluids and materials. Understanding the structure and dynamics of ion networks is crucial for designing new materials with tailored properties.
- Graph Theory Analysis: Ions often self-assemble into large and polydisperse aggregates in solution. Graph-theoretical approaches have been applied to quantitatively study morphological characteristics of these structural patterns including ion networks. In this approach, the aggregate structures taken from MD trajectories are treated as mathematical structures called graphs, and their properties, such as graph spectrum, degree distribution, clustering coefficient, minimum path length, and graph entropy, are calculated and analyzed. For example, this approach has been used to identify two morphologically different ion aggregates, namely localized clusters and extended networks, in high-salt solutions of the Hofmeister series of ions.
