= Isothiouronium =

S-Ethylisothiouronium diethylphosphate: an example of an isothiuronium compound

In organic chemistry, isothiouronium is a functional group with the formula [RSC(NH_{2})_{2}]^{+} (R = alkyl, aryl) and is the acid salt of isothiourea. The H centres can also be replaced by alkyl and aryl. Structurally, these cations resemble guanidinium cations. The CN_{2}S core is planar and the C–N bonds are short.

== Synthesis ==
Salts comprising these cations are typically prepared by alkylation of thiourea:

SC(NH_{2})_{2} + RX → [RSC(NH_{2})_{2}]^{+}X^{−}

== Reactions ==
Hydrolysis of isothiouronium salts gives thiols.

[RSC(NH_{2})_{2}]^{+}X^{−} + NaOH → RSH + OC(NH_{2})_{2} + NaX

Isothiouronium salts in which the sulfur has been alkylated, such as S-methylisothiourea hemisulfate (CAS number: 867-44-7), will convert amines into guanidinium groups. This approach is sometimes called the Rathke synthesis after Bernhard Rathke who first reported it in 1881.

RNH_{2} + [CH_{3}SC(NH_{2})_{2}]^{+}X^{−} → [CH_{3}N(H)C(NH_{2})_{2}]^{+}X^{−} + CH_{3}SH

Chelating resins with isothiouronium groups are used to recover mercury and other noble metals including platinum from solutions.
