= Hofmeister series =

Classification of ions for denaturating proteins

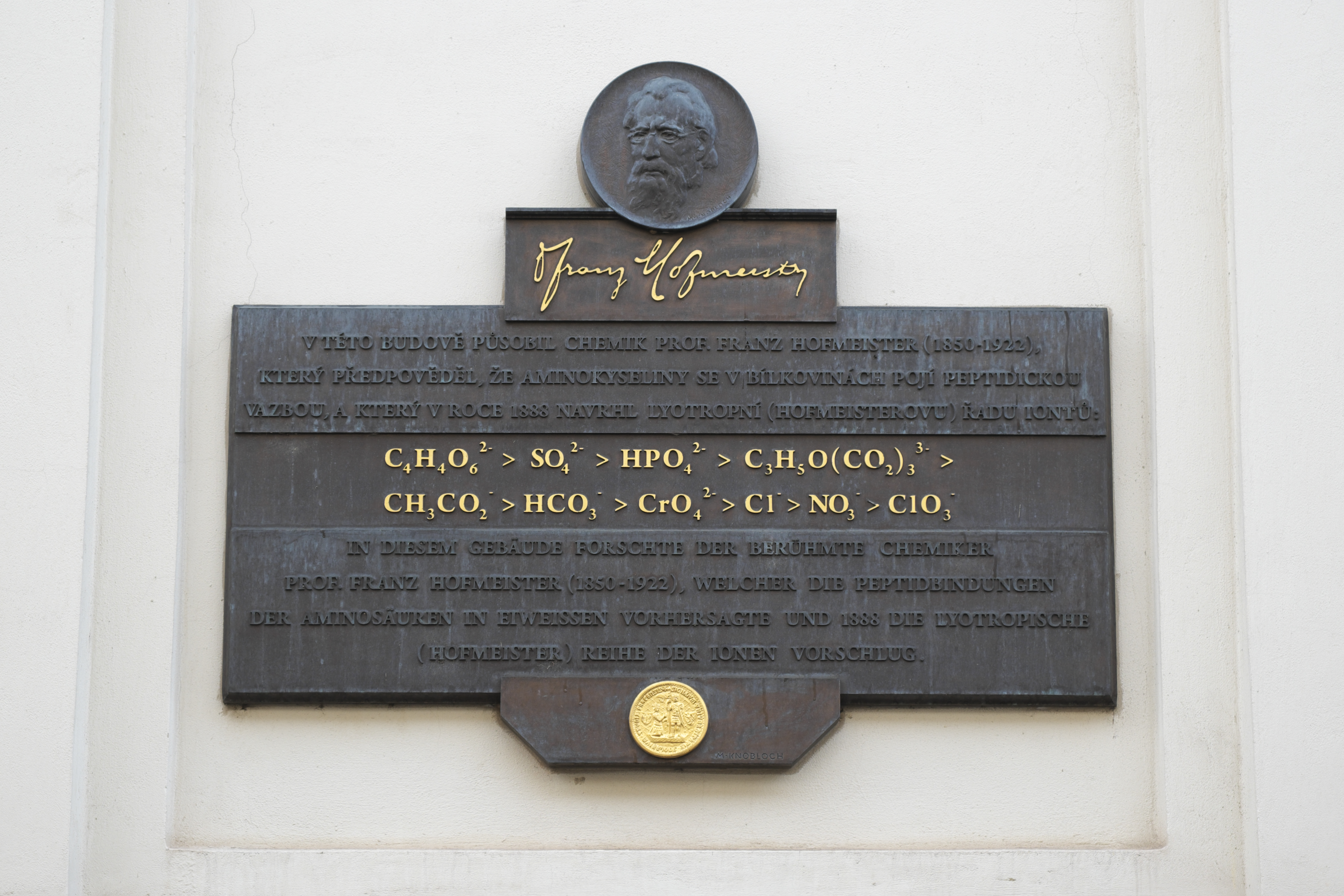
Memorial plaque to the Hofmeister series in Prague

The Hofmeister series or lyotropic series is a classification of ions in order of their lyotrophic properties, which is the ability to salt out or salt in proteins. The effects of these changes were first worked out by Franz Hofmeister, who studied the effects of cations and anions on the solubility of proteins.

== Kosmotropes and chaotropes ==
Highly charged ions interact strongly with water, breaking hydrogen bonds and inducing electrostatic structuring of nearby water, and are thus called "structure-makers" or "kosmotropes". Conversely, weak ions can disrupt the structure of water, and are thus called "structure-breakers" or "chaotropes". The order of the tendency of ions to make or break water structure is the basis of the Hofmeister series.

Hofmeister discovered a series of salts that have consistent effects on the solubility of proteins and, as it was discovered later, on the stability of their secondary and tertiary structures. Anions appear to have a larger effect than cations, and are usually ordered as follows:

(kosmotropic) : $\mathrm{Citrate^{3-} > F^{-} > PO_{4}^{3-} > SO_{4}^{2-} > OAc^{-} > MeSO_{4}^{-} > Cl^{-} > Br^{-} > I^{-} > BF_{4}^{-} > SCN^{-}}$ (chaotropic)

This is a partial list as many more salts have been studied, which applies to cations as well. The order of cations is usually given as:

(kosmotropic) : $\mathrm{(CH_{3})_{4}N^{+} > NH_{4}^{+} > K^{+} > Na^{+} > Cs^{+} > Li^{+} > Mg^{2+} > Ca^{2+} > Ba^{2+} > Guanidinium^{+}}$ (chaotropic)

When oppositely charged kosmotropic cations and anions are in solution together, they are attracted to each other, rather than to water, and the same can be said for chaotropic cations and anions. Thus, the preferential associations of oppositely charged ions can be ordered as:

kosmotrope-kosmotrope > kosmotrope-water > water-water > chaotrope-water > chaotrope-chaotrope

Combining kosmotropic anions with kosmotropic cations reduces the kosmotropic effect of these ions because they are pairing to each other too strongly to be structuring water. Kosmotropic anions do not readily pair with chaotropic cations. The combination of kosmotropic anions with chaotropic cations is the best ion combination to stabilize proteins.

== Mechanism ==
The mechanism of the Hofmeister series is not entirely clear, but does not seem to result from changes in general water structure, instead more specific interactions between ions and proteins and ions and the water molecules directly contacting the proteins may be more important. Simulation studies have shown that the variation in solvation energy between the ions and the surrounding water molecules underlies the mechanism of the Hofmeister series. A quantum chemical investigation suggests an electrostatic origin to the Hofmeister series. This work provides site-centred radial charge densities of the ions' interacting atoms (to approximate the electrostatic potential energy of interaction), and these appear to quantitatively correlate with many reported Hofmeister series for electrolyte properties, reaction rates and macromolecular stability (such as polymer solubility, and virus and enzyme activities).

Early members of the series increase solvent surface tension and decrease the solubility of nonpolar molecules ("salting out"); In effect, they strengthen the hydrophobic interaction. By contrast, later salts in the series increase the solubility of nonpolar molecules ("salting in") and decrease the order in water; in effect, they weaken the hydrophobic effect.

The salting out effect is commonly exploited in protein purification through the use of ammonium sulfate precipitation. However, these salts also interact directly with proteins (which are charged and have strong dipole moments) and may even bind specifically (e.g., phosphate and sulfate binding to ribonuclease A). As a result, these interactions can lead to protein denaturation, the formation of artificial adducts, or the partial dissociation of (metal) cofactors, thus, disrupting the delicate balance between apo- and holometalloproteins.

Ions that have a strong salting in effect such as I^{−} and SCN^{−} are strong denaturants, because they salt in the peptide group, and thus, interact much more strongly with the unfolded form of a protein than with its native form. Consequently, they shift the chemical equilibrium of the unfolding reaction towards unfolded protein.

== Complications ==
The denaturing of proteins by an aqueous solution containing many types of ions is more complicated as all the ions can act, according to their Hofmeister activity, i.e., a fractional number specifying the position of the ion in the series (given previously) in terms of its relative efficiency in denaturing a reference protein.

At high salt concentrations lysozyme protein aggregation obeys the Hofmeister series originally observed by Hofmeister in the 1870s, but at low salt concentrations electrostatic interactions rather than ion dispersion forces affect protein stability resulting in the series being reversed. However, at high concentrations of salt, the solubility of the proteins drops sharply and proteins can precipitate out.

Ion binding to carboxylic surface groups of macromolecules can either follow the Hofmeister series or the reversed Hofmeister series depending on the pH.

The concept of Hofmeister ionicity I_{h} has been invoked by Dharma-wardana et al. where it is proposed to define I_{h} as a sum over all ionic species, of the product of the ionic concentration (mole fraction) and a fractional number specifying the "Hofmeister strength" of the ion in denaturing a given reference protein. The concept of ionicity (as a measure of the Hofmeister strength) used here has to be distinguished from ionic strength as used in electrochemistry, and also from its use in the theory of solid semiconductors.

The relative stability of metal ion-protein binding, which affects the conformational stability of metal cofactor-containing proteins in (denaturing) solution, is reflected by the Irving–Williams series.
