= Benzamil =

Names
- IUPAC name 3,5-diamino-N-[(1E)-amino(benzylamino)methylidene]-6-chloropyrazine-2-carboxamide

Identifiers
CAS Number	2898-76-2
3D model (JSmol)	Interactive image; Interactive image
ChEMBL	ChEMBL212579
ChemSpider	97202
IUPHAR/BPS	4145
KEGG	C13751
MeSH	benzamil
PubChem CID	108107
UNII	04659UUJ94
CompTox Dashboard (EPA)	DTXSID90183179
- InChI: InChI=1S/C13H14ClN7O/c14-9-11(16)20-10(15)8(19-9)12(22)21-13(17)18-6-7-4-2-1-3-5-7/h1-5H,6H2,(H4,15,16,20)(H3,17,18,21,22) Key: KXDROGADUISDGY-UHFFFAOYSA-N; InChI=1/C13H14ClN7O/c14-9-11(16)20-10(15)8(19-9)12(22)21-13(17)18-6-7-4-2-1-3-5-7/h1-5H,6H2,(H4,15,16,20)(H3,17,18,21,22) Key: KXDROGADUISDGY-UHFFFAOYAA
- SMILES: Clc2nc(C(=O)\N=C(/N)NCc1ccccc1)c(N)nc2N; Clc2nc(C(=O)NC(=N/Cc1ccccc1)/N)c(nc2N)N

Properties
Chemical formula	C_{13}H_{14}ClN_{7}O
Molar mass	319.75 g/mol
- Except where otherwise noted, data are given for materials in their standard state (at 25 °C [77 °F], 100 kPa). verify (what is ?) Infobox references

Benzamil or benzyl amiloride is a potent blocker of the ENaC channel and also a sodium-calcium exchange blocker. It is a potent analog of amiloride, and is marketed as the hydrochloride salt (benzamil hydrochloride). As amiloride, benzamil has been studied as a possible treatment for cystic fibrosis, although with disappointing results.

== Structure ==
Benzamil is a benzyl group-containing analog of amiloride. Like amiloride, it is a guanidinium group-containing pyrazine derivative.

== Mechanism of action ==
Amiloride.

Benzamil is closely related to amiloride. By adding the benzyl group to the nitrogen of the guanidinium group the activity is increased several hundredfold.

Amiloride works by directly blocking the epithelial sodium channel (ENaC) thereby inhibiting sodium reabsorption in the distal convoluted tubules and collecting ducts in the kidneys (this mechanism is the same for triamterene). This promotes the loss of sodium and water from the body, but without depleting potassium.
