= Guanidinium thiocyanate =

Identifiers
CAS Number	593-84-0
3D model (JSmol)	Interactive image
ChemSpider	58557
ECHA InfoCard	100.008.922
EC Number	209-812-1
PubChem CID	65046
UNII	GCA2EU297U
CompTox Dashboard (EPA)	DTXSID6060478
- InChI: InChI=1S/CH5N3.CHNS/c2-1(3)4;2-1-3/h(H5,2,3,4);3H Key: ZJYYHGLJYGJLLN-UHFFFAOYSA-N; InChI=1/CH5N3.CHNS/c2-1(3)4;2-1-3/h(H5,2,3,4);3H Key: ZJYYHGLJYGJLLN-UHFFFAOYAS
- SMILES: N#CS.[N@H]=C(N)N

Properties
Chemical formula	C_{2}H_{6}N_{4}S
Molar mass	118.16 g·mol^{−1}

Hazards
- GHS labelling
Pictograms	(GHS05: Corrosive) (GHS07: Exclamation mark)
Signal word	Danger
Hazard statements	H302, H312, H314, H332, H412
Precautionary statements	P260, P264, P270, P271, P273, P280, P301+P312, P301+P330+P331, P302+P352, P303+P361+P353, P304+P312, P304+P340, P305+P351+P338, P310, P312, P321, P322, P330, P363, P405, P501
Safety data sheet (SDS)	External MSDS
- Except where otherwise noted, data are given for materials in their standard state (at 25 °C [77 °F], 100 kPa). verify (what is ?) Infobox references

Guanidinium thiocyanate (GTC) or guanidinium isothiocyanate (GITC) is a chemical compound used as a general protein denaturant, being a chaotropic agent, although it is most commonly used as a nucleic acid protector in the extraction of DNA and RNA from cells.

GITC may also be recognized as guanidine thiocyanate. This is because guanidinium is the conjugate acid of guanidine and is called the guanidinium cation, [CH_{6}N_{3}]^{+}.

== Uses ==
Guanidinium thiocyanate can be used to deactivate a virus, such as the influenza virus that caused the 1918 "Spanish flu", so that it can be studied safely.

Guanidinium thiocyanate is also used to lyse cells and virus particles in RNA and DNA extractions, where its function, in addition to its lysing action, is to prevent activity of RNase enzymes and DNase enzymes by denaturing them. These enzymes would otherwise damage the extract.

A commonly used method is guanidinium thiocyanate-phenol-chloroform extraction. It is not strictly necessary to use phenol or chloroform if extracting RNA for Northern blotting or DNA for Southern blot analysis because the gel electrophoresis followed by transfer to a membrane will separate the RNA/DNA from the proteins. Additionally, since these methods use probes to bind to their conjugates, peptides that get through the process don't generally matter unless a peptide is an RNase or DNase, and then only if the enzyme manages to renature, which should not occur if proper protocols are followed. A possible exception might be when working with temperature extremophiles because some enzymes of these organisms can remain stable under extraordinary circumstances.

== Preparation ==
This substance can be prepared by reacting guanidinium carbonate with ammonium sulfate or ammonium thiocyanate under heat. Another method is the pyrolysis of ammonium thiocyanate or thiourea at 180°C.

== See also ==
- Guanidine hydrochloride
