= AGPC =

AGPC may refer to:

- α-GPC (alpha-GPC), a natural choline compound found in the brain
- Acid guanidinium thiocyanate-phenol-chloroform extraction, a liquid–liquid extraction technique in biochemistry
- Association of Game & Puzzle Collectors
- Australian Grand Prix Corporation
