= Trizol =

Chemical solution used in RNA/DNA/protein extraction

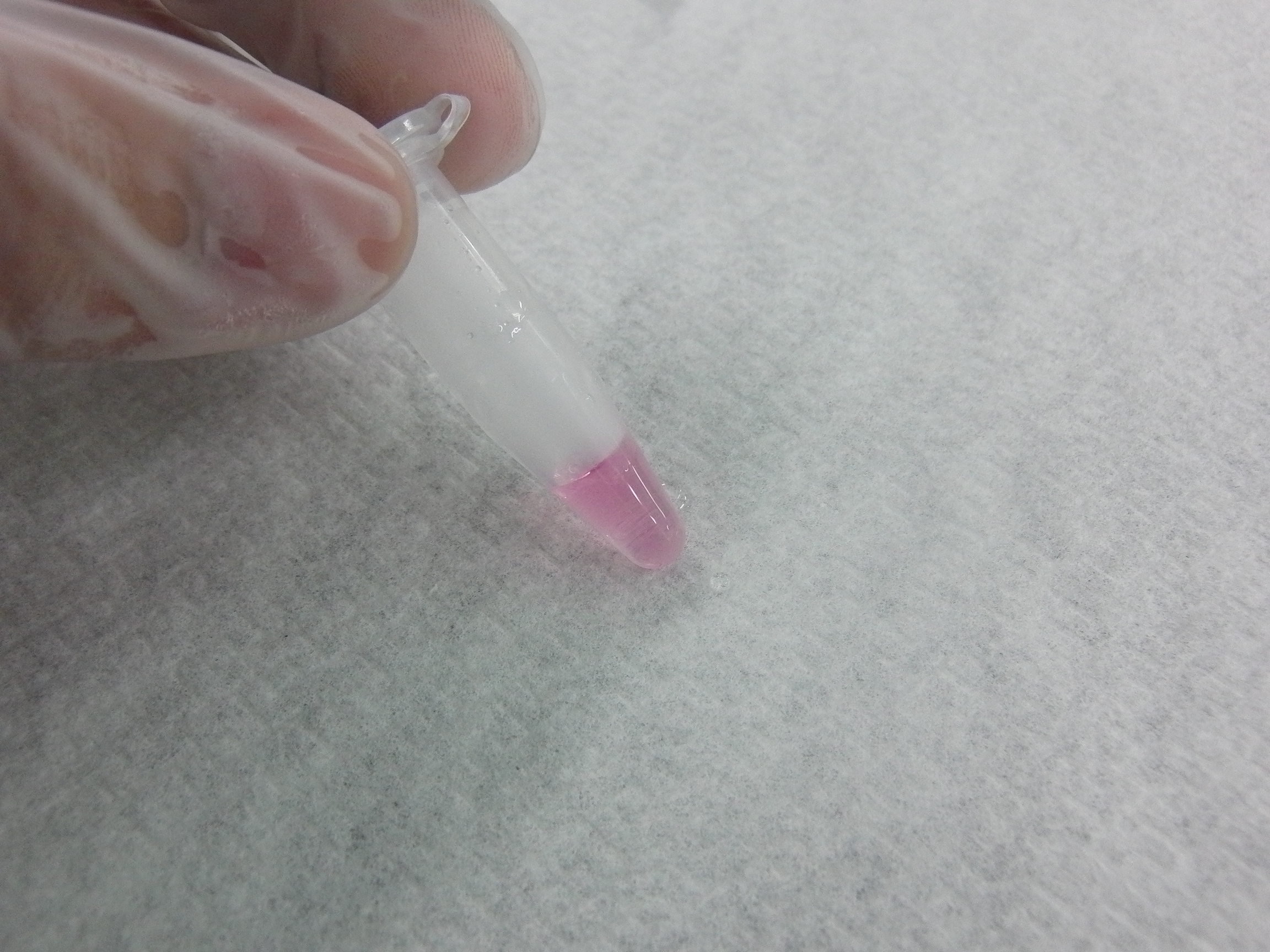
TRIzol reagent contains guanidinium thiocyanate and phenol.

TRIzol is a widely used chemical solution used in the extraction of DNA, RNA, and proteins from cells. The solution was initially used and published by Piotr Chomczyński and Nicoletta Sacchi in 1987.

TRIzol is the brand name of guanidinium thiocyanate from the Ambion part of Life Technologies, and Tri-Reagent is the brand name from MRC, which was founded by Chomczynski.

== Uses in extraction ==
The correct name of the method is guanidinium thiocyanate-phenol-chloroform extraction. The use of TRIzol can result in DNA yields comparable to other extraction methods, and it leads to >50% bigger RNA yield. An alternative method for RNA extraction is phenol extraction and TCA/acetone precipitation. Chloroform should be exchanged with 1-bromo-3-chloropropane when using the new generation TRI Reagent.

DNA and RNA from TRIzol and TRI reagent can also be extracted using the Direct-zol Miniprep kit by Zymo Research. This method eliminates the use of Chloroform and 1-bromo-3-chloropropane completely, bypassing phase-separation and precipitation steps.

TRIzol is light-sensitive and is often stored in a dark-colored, glass container covered in foil. It is stored at room temperature.

When used, it resembles cough syrup, bright pink. The smell of the phenol is extremely strong. TRIzol works by maintaining RNA integrity during tissue homogenization, while at the same time disrupting and breaking down cells and cell components.

== Hazards ==
Vigilant caution should be taken while using TRIzol (due to the phenol and chloroform).

TRIzol is labeled as acute oral, dermal, and inhalation toxicity besides skin corrosion/irritation in the manufacturer MDS.

Exposure to TRIzol can be a serious health hazard. Exposure can lead to serious chemical burns, permanent scarring and kidney failure.

Experiments should be performed under a chemical hood, with lab coat, nitrile gloves and a plastic apron.

TRIzol waste should never be mixed with bleach or acids: the guanidinium thiocyanate in TRIzol reacts to form highly toxic gases.
