= Ammonium sulfate precipitation =

Method of protein purification

Ammonium sulfate precipitation is one of the most commonly used methods for large and laboratory scale protein purification and fractionation that can be used to separate proteins by altering their solubility in the presence of a high salt concentration.

== Properties ==
Ammonium sulfate is an inorganic salt with a high solubility that disassociates into ammonium (NH^{+}_{4}) and sulfate (SO^{2−}_{4}) in aqueous solutions. Ammonium sulfate is especially useful as a precipitant because it is highly soluble, stabilizes protein structure, has a relatively low density, is readily available, and is relatively inexpensive.

== Mechanism ==
Ammonium sulfate, as well as other neutral salts, will stabilize proteins by preferential solvation. Proteins are usually stored in ammonium sulfate because it inhibits bacterial growth. With the addition of ammonium sulfate, proteins unfolded by denaturants can be pushed into their native conformations. This can be seen with the folding of recombinant proteins.

The solubility of proteins varies according to the ionic strength of the solution, thus according to the salt concentration. At low ion concentrations (less than 0.5 mol/L), the solubility of proteins increases with increasing salt concentration, an effect termed "salting in". As the salt concentration is further increased, the solubility of the protein begins to decrease. At a sufficiently high ionic strength, the protein will precipitate out of the solution, an effect termed "salting out". When the ammonium (NH^{+}_{4}) and sulfate (SO^{2−}_{4}) ions are within the aqueous solution they are attracted to the opposite charges evident on the compound that is being purified. This attraction of opposite charges prevents the water molecules from interacting with the compound being purified, leading to the precipitation or "salting out".

Proteins differ markedly in their solubilities at high ionic strength, therefore, "salting out" is a very useful procedure to assist in the purification of the desired protein. Ammonium sulfate is commonly used for precipitation because of its high solubility, additionally, it forms two ions high in the Hofmeister series. Because these two ions are at the end of Hofmeister series, ammonium sulfate can also stabilize a protein structure. The ammonium sulfate solubility behavior for a protein is usually expressed as a function of the percentage of saturation. A solubility curve can be determined by plotting the log of the experimentally determined solubility, expressed as mg/mL, versus the percentage saturation of ammonium sulfate.

With the mechanism of salting-out, there is an omission of the salt from the layer of water, which is closely associated with the surface of the protein, known as the hydration layer. The hydration layer plays a vital role in sustaining solubility and suitable natural conformation. There are three main protein-water interaction: ion hydration between charged side chains, hydrogen bonding between polar groups and water, and hydrophobic hydration. Once salt is added to the mixture, there is an increase in the surface tension of the water, thus increasing hydrophobic interactions between water and the protein of interest. The protein of interest then reduces its surface area, which diminishes its contact with the solvent. This is shown by the folding and self-association, which ultimately leads to precipitation. The folding and self-association of the protein pushes out free water, leading to an increase in entropy and making this process energetically favorable.

== Procedure ==
Typically, the ammonium sulfate concentration is increased stepwise, and the precipitated protein is recovered at each stage. This is usually done by adding solid ammonium sulfate; however, calculating the amount of ammonium sulfate that should be added to add to a solution to achieve the desired concentration may be difficult because the addition of ammonium sulfate significantly increases the volume of the solution. The amount of ammonium sulfate that should be added to the solution can be determined from published nomograms or by using an online calculator. The direct addition of solid ammonium sulfate does change the pH of the solution, which can lead to loss of enzyme activity. In those cases, the addition of saturated ammonium sulfate in a suitable buffer is used as an alternative to adding solid ammonium sulfate. In either approach, the resulting protein precipitate can be dissolved individually in a standard buffer and assayed to determine the total protein content.

The ammonium sulfate concentration added should be increased to a value that will precipitate most of the protein of interest whilst leaving the maximum amount of protein contaminants still in the solution. The precipitated protein of interest can subsequently be recovered by centrifugation and dissolved in standard buffer to prepare the sample for the next stage of purification.

In the next stage of purification, all this added salt needs to be removed from the protein. One way to do so is using dialysis, but dialysis further dilutes the concentrated protein. The better way of removing ammonium sulfate from the protein is mixing the precipitate protein in a buffer containing a mixture of SDS, Tris-HCl, and phenol and centrifuging the mixture. The precipitate that comes out of this centrifugation will contain salt-less concentrated protein.

== Applications ==
Ammonium sulfate precipitation is a useful technique as an initial step in protein purification because it enables quick, bulk precipitation of cellular proteins. It is also often employed during the later stages of purification to concentrate protein from dilute solution following procedures such as gel filtration. The drawback of this method is that oftentimes different substances can precipitate along with the protein, and other purification techniques must be performed, such as ion chromatography or size-exclusion chromatography.
