= Ion-exchange resin =

Organic polymer matrix bearing ion-exchange functional groups

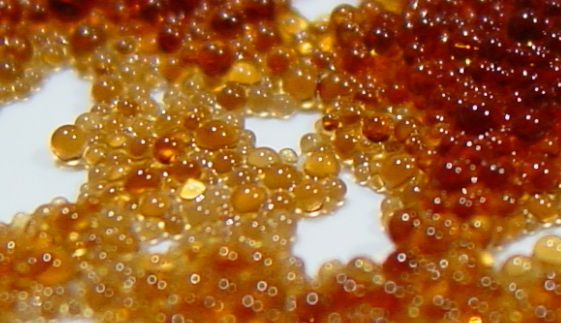
Ion-exchange resin beads

An ion-exchange resin or ion-exchange polymer is a resin or polymer that acts as a medium for ion exchange, that is also known as an ionex. It is an insoluble matrix (or support structure) normally in the form of small (0.25–1.43 mm radius) microbeads, usually white or yellowish, fabricated from an organic polymer substrate. The beads are typically porous (with a specific size distribution that will affect its properties), providing a large surface area on and inside them where the trapping of ions occurs along with the accompanying release of other ions, and thus the process is called ion exchange. There are multiple types of ion-exchange resin, that differ in composition if the target is an anion or a cation and are created based on the task they are required for. Most commercial resins are made of polystyrene sulfonate which is followed by polyacrylate.

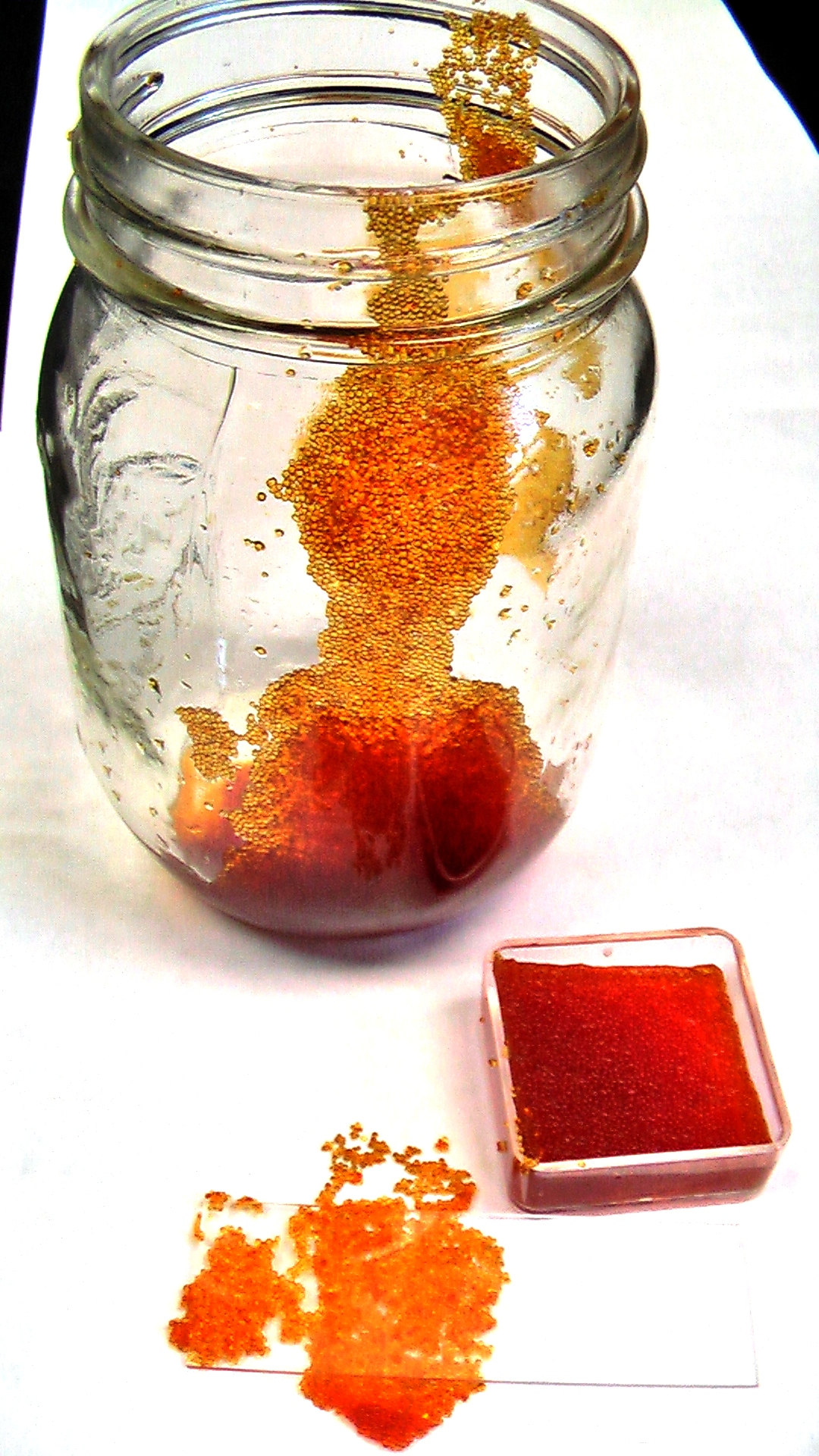
Ion-exchange resin beads

Ion-exchange resins are widely used in different separation, purification, and decontamination processes. The most common examples are water softening and water purification. In many cases, ion-exchange resins were introduced in such processes as a more flexible alternative to the use of natural or artificial zeolites.

== Types of resins ==
Most typical ion-exchange resins are based on crosslinked polystyrene. The actual ion-exchanging sites are introduced after polymerisation. Additionally, in the case of polystyrene, crosslinking is introduced by copolymerisation of styrene and a few percent of divinylbenzene. Crosslinking decreases ion-exchange capacity of the resin and prolongs the time needed to accomplish the ion-exchange processes but improves the robustness of the resin. Particle size also influences the resin parameters; smaller particles have larger outer surface, but cause larger head loss in the column processes.

Besides being made as bead-shaped materials, ion-exchange resins are also produced as membranes. These ion-exchange membranes, which are made of highly cross-linked ion-exchange resins that allow passage of ions, but not of water, are used for electrodialysis.

Four main types of ion-exchange resins differ in their functional groups:

- strongly acidic cation (SAC), typically featuring sulfonic acid groups, e.g. sodium polystyrene sulfonate or polyAMPS, often used for water softening and demineralization operations.
- strongly basic anion (SBA), typically featuring quaternary amino groups, for example, trimethylammonium groups, e.g. polyAPTAC), good for silica, uranium, nitrates removal.
- weakly acidic cation (WAC), typically featuring carboxylic acid groups. An ideal choice for dealkalization part and also for softening streams with high salinity levels.
- weakly basic anion (WBA), typically featuring primary, secondary, and/or tertiary amino groups, e.g. polyethylene amine. Are effective for demineralization where removal of SiO_{2} and CO_{2} are not required. Also effective for acid absorption.

Specialised ion-exchange resins are also known such as chelating resins (iminodiacetic acid, thiourea-based resins, and many others).

Anion resins and cation resins are the two most common resins used in the ion-exchange process. While anion resins attract negatively charged ions, cation resins attract positively charged ions.

=== Anion-exchange resins ===
Formula: R-OH basic

Anion resins may be either strongly or weakly basic. Strongly basic anion resins maintain their negative charge across a wide pH range, whereas weakly basic anion resins are neutralized at higher pH levels. Weakly basic resins do not maintain their charge at a high pH because they undergo deprotonation. They do, however, offer excellent mechanical and chemical stability. This, combined with a high rate of ion exchange, make weakly base anion resins well suited for the organic salts.

For anion resins, regeneration typically involves treatment of the resin with a strongly basic solution, e.g. aqueous sodium hydroxide. Regenerant strength (1–4 % NaOH) and contact time must be optimized to avoid excessive osmotic stress on the polymer matrix. These anion resins can be regenerated by flushing them with a caustic solution (typically 1–4 % NaOH as mentioned before). During regeneration process, the regenerant chemical is passed through the resin, and trapped negative ions are flushed out, renewing the resin exchange capacity.

=== Cation-exchange resin ===
Formula: R−H acidic

The cation exchange method removes the hardness of water but induces acidity in it, which is further removed in the next stage of treatment of water by passing this acidic water through an anion exchange process.

Reaction:

R−H + M^{+} = R−M + H^{+}.

Similar to anion resins, in cation resins the regeneration involves the use of a strongly acidic solution, e.g. aqueous hydrochloric acid. During regeneration, the regenerant chemical passes through the resin and flushes out the trapped positive ions, renewing the resin exchange capacity.

=== Anion-exchange resin ===
Formula: –NR_{4}^{+}OH^{−}

Often these are styrene–divinylbenzene copolymer resins that have quaternary ammonium cations as an integral part of the resin matrix.

Reaction:

–NR_{4}^{+}OH^{−} + HCl = –NR_{4}^{+}Cl^{−} + H_{2}O.

Anion-exchange chromatography makes use of this principle to extract and purify materials from mixtures or solutions.

== Characteristics ==
Ion exchange resins are often described according to some of the following features.

- Capacity: Represents the amount of ions that can be exchanged/stored per unit of mass of the resin. Typically is expressed in milligrams of ion per gram of resin (mg/g).
- Swelling: Into contact with solvent, resins can swell (increase in volume). The swelling behavior of a resin is influenced by its chemical composition, polymer structure, and cross-linking. Resins with a higher degree of cross-linking tend to exhibit lower swelling tendencies compared to those with lower cross-linking. Swelling is typically expressed as the percentage increase in volume or weight of the resin when exposed to a specific solvent.
- Selectivity: Refers to the resin's preference or ability to selectively adsorb or exchange certain ions over others. It is a fundamental property that determines the resin's effectiveness in separating or removing specific ions from a solution.
- Stability: The integrity of the resin can be described in terms of mechanical and chemical resilience of the beads.

== Factors affecting ion exchange resin efficiency ==
The efficiency of ion exchange resins is influenced by a combination of physical, chemical, and operational factors. These variables determine how effectively the resin can exchange ions, maintain selectivity, and preserve its structural integrity over time.

The structural properties of the resin are fundamental to its performance. Attributes such as particle size, internal porosity, and the degree of cross-linking control the accessibility of exchange sites. Smaller particles tend to offer faster ion exchange due to greater surface area, although they can also lead to increased resistance to flow in packed bed systems.

Temperature is another key factor. In general, higher temperatures accelerate ion mobility and enhance exchange kinetics. However, prolonged exposure to elevated temperatures can degrade the resin's polymer matrix or functional groups, particularly in weakly acidic or basic resins. There are however, resins rated for higher temperatures (up to 120 °C) which employ reinforced polymer backbones to withstand thermal stress on the system.

The pH of the solution directly affects the ionization state of both the resin and the solutes. While strong acid and strong base resins maintain their functionality across a wide pH range, weak resins may lose efficiency outside their optimal pH window. The pH also influences the speciation of certain ions, impacting their affinity for the resin.

Ionic concentration determines the driving force for ion exchange. Higher concentrations can increase exchange rates but may also lead to faster resin saturation and lower selectivity, especially in the presence of competing ions. Divalent and trivalent ions generally exhibit stronger binding to the resin compared to monovalent ions.

Flow rate and contact time are critical in continuous systems. If the liquid passes through the resin too quickly, the ions may not have sufficient time to diffuse into the resin structure, resulting in incomplete exchange. Optimizing flow conditions ensures more efficient resin utilization.

Fouling and contamination are common challenges in long-term operation. Organic matter, metal oxides, microbial growth, or suspended solids can obstruct the resin matrix and reduce the availability of exchange sites. Preventive measures, such as pre-filtration, regular cleaning, and resin regeneration, help maintain performance and prolong service life.

Regeneration and the lifecycle of the best-operated resin eventually exhausts. Thermal reactivation (steam or hot caustic at 120–150 °C) and chemical regeneration (acid/base washes) restore capacity, but each cycle erodes ~0.5–2 % of exchange sites leading to the need of replacement as time goes on. This makes tracking cycle count and capacity loss per cycle important as it informs operators of the need for scheduled resin replacement before contaminant leakage occurs.

== Pores ==
The pore media of the resin particles is one of the most important parameters for the efficiency of the product. These pores make different functions depending on their sizes and are the main feature responsible for the mass transfer between phases making the whole ion exchange process possible. There are three main types of pore sizes:

- Micropore: With a Slit width less than 2 nm, they are usually found at the end of larger pores and their main characteristic is to have superimposed wall potentials. This means, the particles inside them feel attracted towards their solid walls so they make contact with the active sites.
- Mesopore: With a Slit width between 2 and 50 nm these mid-size pores have the main objective to withhold capillary condensation and is usually found before the micropores.
- Macropore: With a Slit width bigger than 50 nm, these are the biggest size pores with the main purpose of being the main path for the molecules to enter the particle and later on redistribute through the other smaller channels

== Uses ==
=== Water softening ===
In this application, Ion-exchange resins are used to replace the magnesium and calcium ions found in hard water with sodium ions. When the resin is fresh, it contains sodium ions at its active sites. When in contact with a solution containing magnesium and calcium ions (but a low concentration of sodium ions), the magnesium and calcium ions preferentially migrate out of solution to the active sites on the resin, being replaced in solution by sodium ions. This process reaches equilibrium with a much lower concentration of magnesium and calcium ions in solution than was started with.

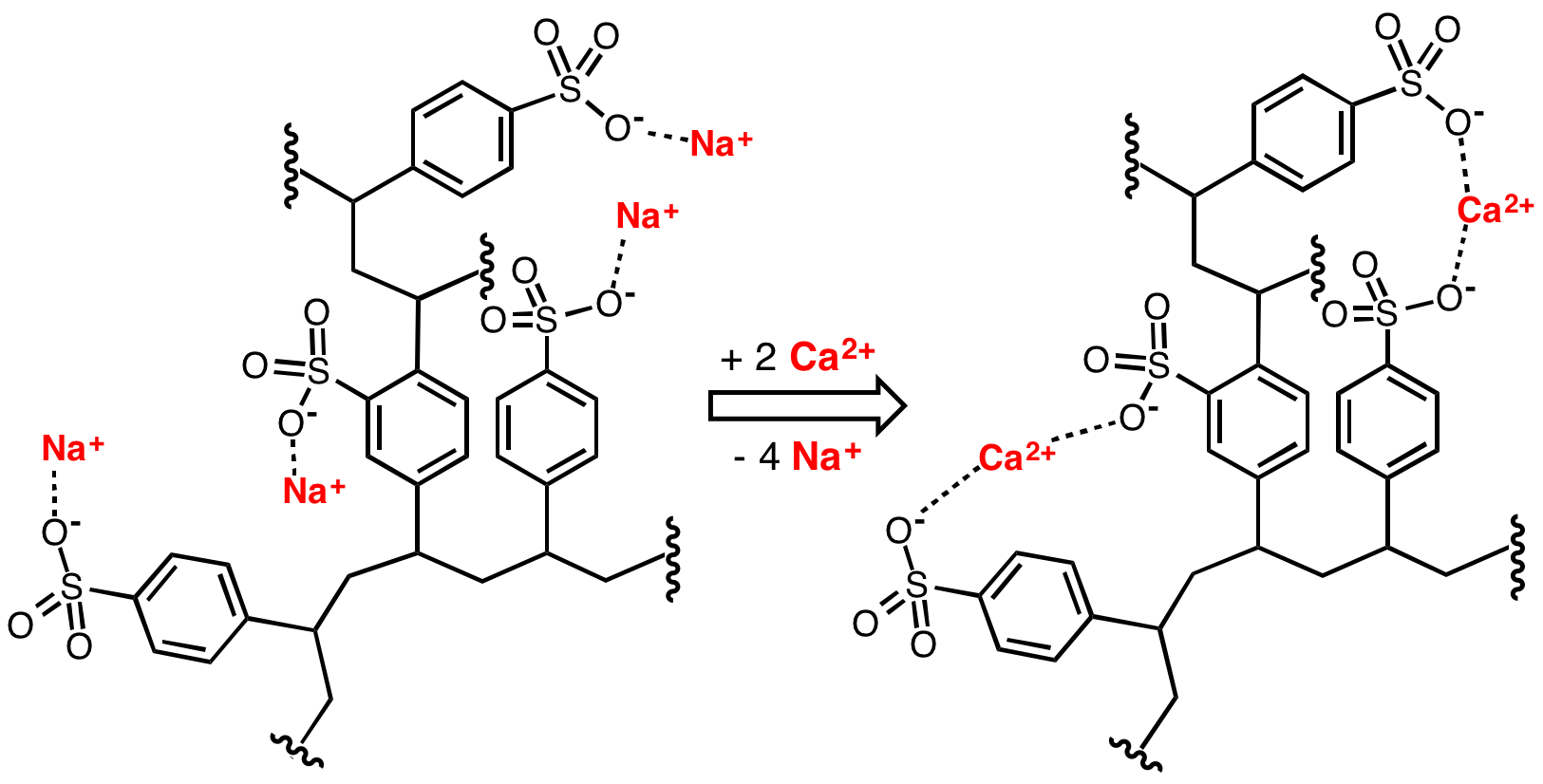
Idealised image of water-softening process, involving replacement of calcium ions in water with sodium ions donated by a cation-exchange resin

The resin can be recharged by washing it with a solution containing a high concentration of sodium ions (e.g. it has large amounts of common salt (NaCl) dissolved in it). The calcium and magnesium ions then migrate from the resin which is actively being replaced by sodium ions from the solution until a new equilibrium is reached. The salt is used to recharge an ion-exchange resin, which itself is used to soften the water.

=== Water purification ===
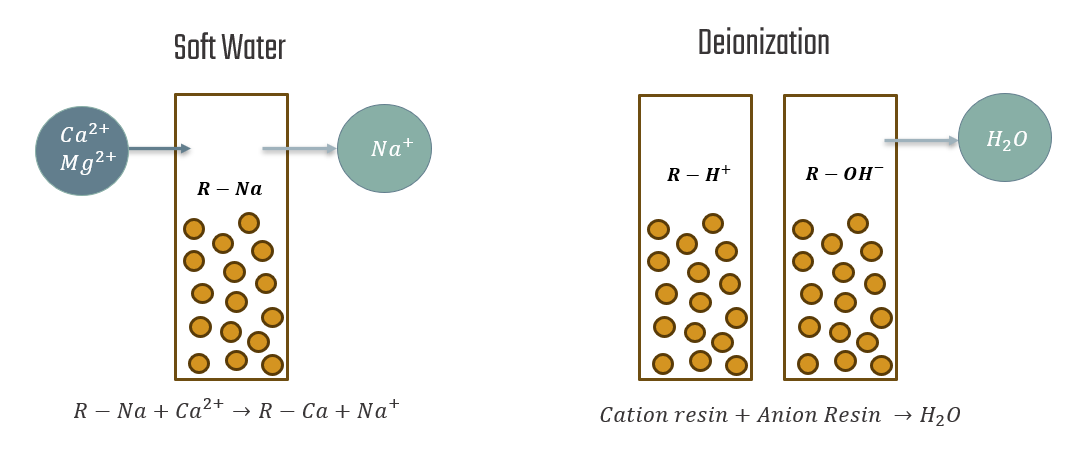
Diagram comparing water softening and deionization.

In this application, ion-exchange resins are used to remove poisonous (e.g. copper) and hazardous metal (e.g. lead or cadmium) ions from solution, replacing them with more innocuous ions, such as sodium and potassium, in the process cation and anion exchange resins are used to remove dissolved ions from the water.

Few ion-exchange resins remove chlorine or organic contaminants from water – this is usually done by using an activated charcoal filter mixed in with the resin. There are some ion-exchange resins that do remove organic ions, such as MIEX (magnetic ion-exchange) resins. Domestic water purification resin is not usually recharged – the resin is discarded when it can no longer be used. These ion-exchange skids that are used and sized for 10 ML/day per bead can have cost upwards of US$1.5–2.5 million when implemented for industrial water treatment.

Water of highest purity is required for many uses ranging from electronics to scientific experiments, as well as the production of superconductors, and within the nuclear industry, among others. Such water is produced using ion-exchange processes or combinations of membrane and ion-exchange methods. This method can prove to be expensive as the secondary waste handling cost can run on average US$0.10–0.20 per cubic meter.

=== Ion exchange in metal separation ===
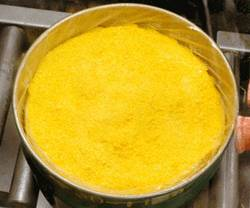
A drum of yellowcake

Ion-exchange processes are used to separate and purify metals, including separating uranium from plutonium and other actinides, including thorium; and lanthanum, neodymium, ytterbium, samarium, lutetium, from each other and the other lanthanides. There are two series of rare-earth metals, the lanthanides and the actinides. Members of each family have very similar chemical and physical properties. Ion exchange was for many years the only practical way to separate the rare earths in large quantities. This application was developed in the 1940s by Frank Spedding. Subsequently, solvent extraction has mostly supplanted use of ion-exchange resins except for the highest-purity products.

A very important case is the PUREX process (plutonium-uranium extraction process), which is used to separate the plutonium and the uranium from the spent fuel products from a nuclear reactor, and to be able to dispose of the waste products. Then, the plutonium and uranium are available for making nuclear-energy materials, such as new reactor fuel and nuclear weapons.

Ion-exchange beads are also an essential component in in-situ leach uranium mining. In-situ recovery involves the extraction of uranium-bearing water (grading as low as 0.05% U_{3}O_{8}) through boreholes. The extracted uranium solution is then filtered through the resin beads. Through an ion-exchange process, the resin beads attract uranium from the solution. Uranium-loaded resins are then transported to a processing plant, where U_{3}O_{8} is separated from the resin beads, and yellowcake is produced. The resin beads can then be returned to the ion-exchange facility, where they are reused.

The ion-exchange process is also used to separate other sets of very similar chemical elements, such as zirconium and hafnium, which incidentally is also very important for the nuclear industry. Zirconium is practically transparent to free neutrons, used in building reactors, but hafnium is a very strong absorber of neutrons, used in reactor control rods.

=== Catalysis ===
Ion exchange resins are used in organic synthesis, e.g. for esterification and hydrolysis. Being high surface area and insoluble, they are suitable for vapor-phase and liquid-phase reactions. Examples can be found where basic (OH^{−}-form) of ion exchange resins are used to neutralize of ammonium salts and convert quaternary ammonium halides to hydroxides. Packed-bed reactors with continuous feed enable high turnover numbers and scale-up for industrial synthesis but may prove costly due to catalyst replenishment costs. Furthermore, acidic (H^{+}-form) ion exchange resins have been used as solid acid catalysts for scission of ether protecting groups. and for rearrangement reactions.

=== Juice purification ===
Ion-exchange resins are used in the manufacture of fruit juices such as orange and cranberry juice, where they are used to remove bitter-tasting components and also improve the flavor. This process also lowers turbidity and off-flavor tastes, while extending shelf life of commercial product goods. This allows tart or poorer-tasting fruit sources to be used to produce juice acceptable to the customers.

=== Sugar manufacturing ===
Ion-exchange resins are used in the manufacturing of sugar from various sources. They are used to help convert one type of sugar into another type of sugar (e.g. glucose isomerization resins convert glucose to fructose under mild conditions, enabling high-fructose syrup production) and to decolorize and purify sugar syrups. This is due to the strong-acid cation resins which exchange metal and color impurities, producing the desired clear, and light-colored sugar syrup.

=== Pharmaceuticals ===
Ion-exchange resins are used in the manufacturing of pharmaceuticals, not only for catalyzing certain reactions, but also for isolating and purifying pharmaceutical active ingredients. Three ion-exchange resins, sodium polystyrene sulfonate, colestipol, and cholestyramine, are used as active ingredients. Sodium polystyrene sulfonate is a strongly acidic ion-exchange resin and is used to treat hyperkalemia. Colestipol is a weakly basic ion-exchange resin and is used to treat hypercholesterolemia. Cholestyramine is a strongly basic ion-exchange resin and is also used to treat hypercholesterolemia. Colestipol and cholestyramine are known as bile acid sequestrants.

Ion-exchange resins are also used as excipients in pharmaceutical formulations such as tablets, capsules, gums, and suspensions. In these uses the ion-exchange resin can have several different functions, including taste-masking, extended release, tablet disintegration, increased bioavailability, and improving the chemical stability of the active ingredients.

Selective polymeric chelators have been proposed for maintenance therapy of some pathologies, where chronic ion accumulation occurs, such as Wilson disease (where copper accumulation occurs) or hereditary hemochromatosis (iron overload, where iron accumulation occurs) These polymers or particles have a negligible or null systemic biological availability and they are designed to form stable complexes with Fe^{2+} and Fe^{3+} in the GIT and thus limiting the uptake of these ions and their long-term accumulation. Although this method has only a limited efficacy, unlike small-molecular chelators (deferasirox, deferiprone, or deferoxamine), such an approach may have only minor side effects in sub-chronic studies. Interestingly, the simultaneous chelation of Fe^{2+} and Fe^{3+} increases the treatment efficacy.

=== Direct air capture ===
Anion exchange resins readily absorb CO_{2} when dry and release it again when exposed to moisture. This makes them one of the most promising materials for direct carbon capture from ambient air or direct air capture, as the moisture swing works to replace the more energy-intensive temperature swing or pressure swing used with other sorbents which then facilitates the desired outcome. A prototype demonstrating this process has been developed by Klaus Lackner at the Center for Negative Carbon Emissions.

== See also ==
- Polyelectrolyte
- Water softening
