= PolyAPTAC =

PolyAPTAC, or poly (acrylamido-N-propyltrimethylammonium chloride), is an organic polymer. It is water-soluble, forms gels when cross linked, and acts as a cationic polyelectrolyte. It can be used for ion exchange resins. It can form hydrogels.

PolyMAPTAC, or poly[(3-(methacryloylamino)-propyl] trimethylammonium chloride), is similar.
