= Martin Rathke =

German embryologist and anatomist (1793–1860)

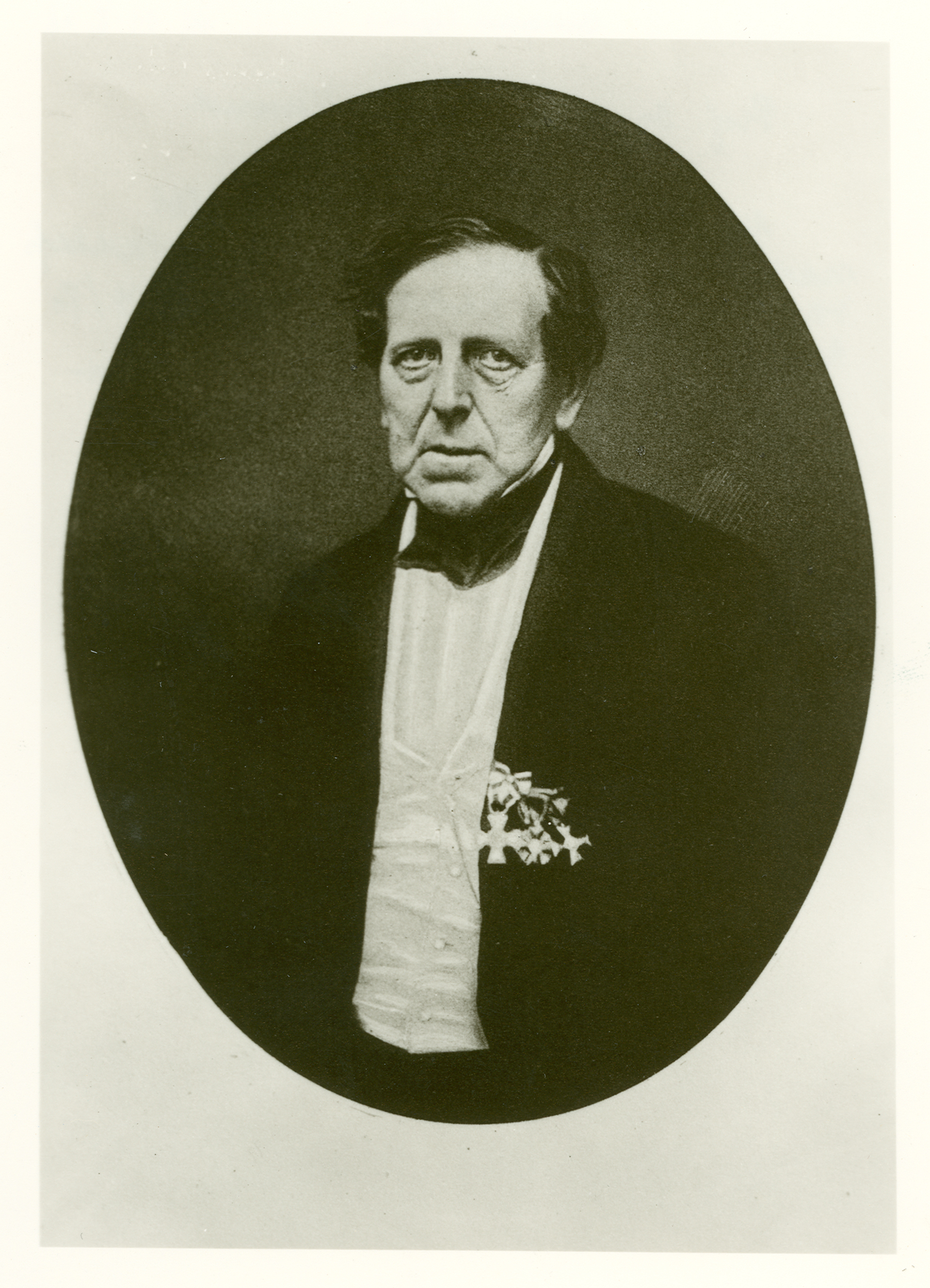
Martin Rathke

Martin Heinrich Rathke (25 August 1793, Danzig – 3 September 1860, Königsberg) was a German embryologist and anatomist. Along with Karl Ernst von Baer and Christian Heinrich Pander, he is recognized as one of the founders of modern embryology. He was the father of chemist Bernhard Rathke (1840–1923).

He studied medicine and natural history at the University of Göttingen, later relocating to Berlin, where he received his doctorate in medicine (1818). In 1828 he was named professor of physiology, pathology and semiotics at the Imperial University of Dorpat. In 1832/33 he undertook research expeditions to Finland and to the Crimea. Rathke was a professor of zoology and anatomy at Königsberg from 1835 to 1860. In 1839, while based in Königsberg, he travelled to Scandinavia, where he conducted studies of marine organisms.

He studied marine organisms and the embryonic development of sex organs. He was the first to describe the brachial clefts and gill arches in the embryos of mammals and birds. He also first described in 1839 the embryonic structure, now known as Rathke's pouch, from which the anterior lobe of the pituitary gland develops.

He was the first to discover that the amphioxus was a separate taxon, and not the larva of a mollusk, as previously thought. He was the author of several writings on crustaceans, mollusks and worms, and also the author of works on vertebrates, such as the lemming and various reptiles.

== Selected works ==
- Abhandlungen zur Bildungs- und Entwicklungs-Geschichte der Menschen und der Thiere. two volumes. Leipzig, F. C. W. Vogel, 1832–1833.
- "Ueber die Entstehung der Glandula pituitaria". Archiv für Anatomie, Physiologie und wissenschaftliche Medicin, Berlin, 1838: 482–485.
- Bemerkungen über den Bau des Amphioxus lanceolatus, eines Fisches aus der Ordnung der Cyclostomas. Königsberg, 1841.
- Entwicklungsgeschichte der Wirbeltiere. Leipzig 1861. (A highly praised work in comparative embryology that was published posthumously by Albert von Kölliker at the request of Rathke's son).
