= Guanidine =

Skeletal formula of guanidine
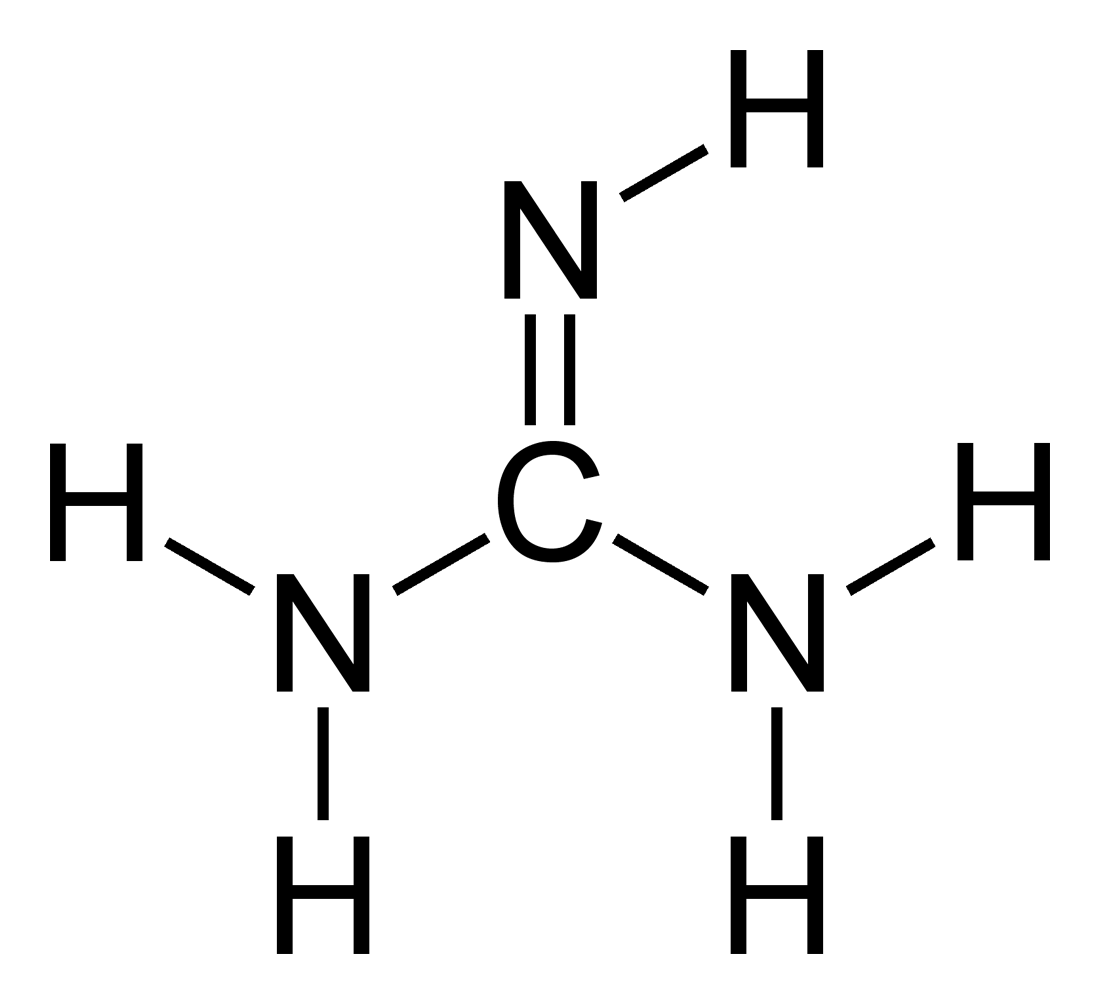
Skeletal formula of guanidine with the implicit carbon shown, and all explicit hydrogens added.
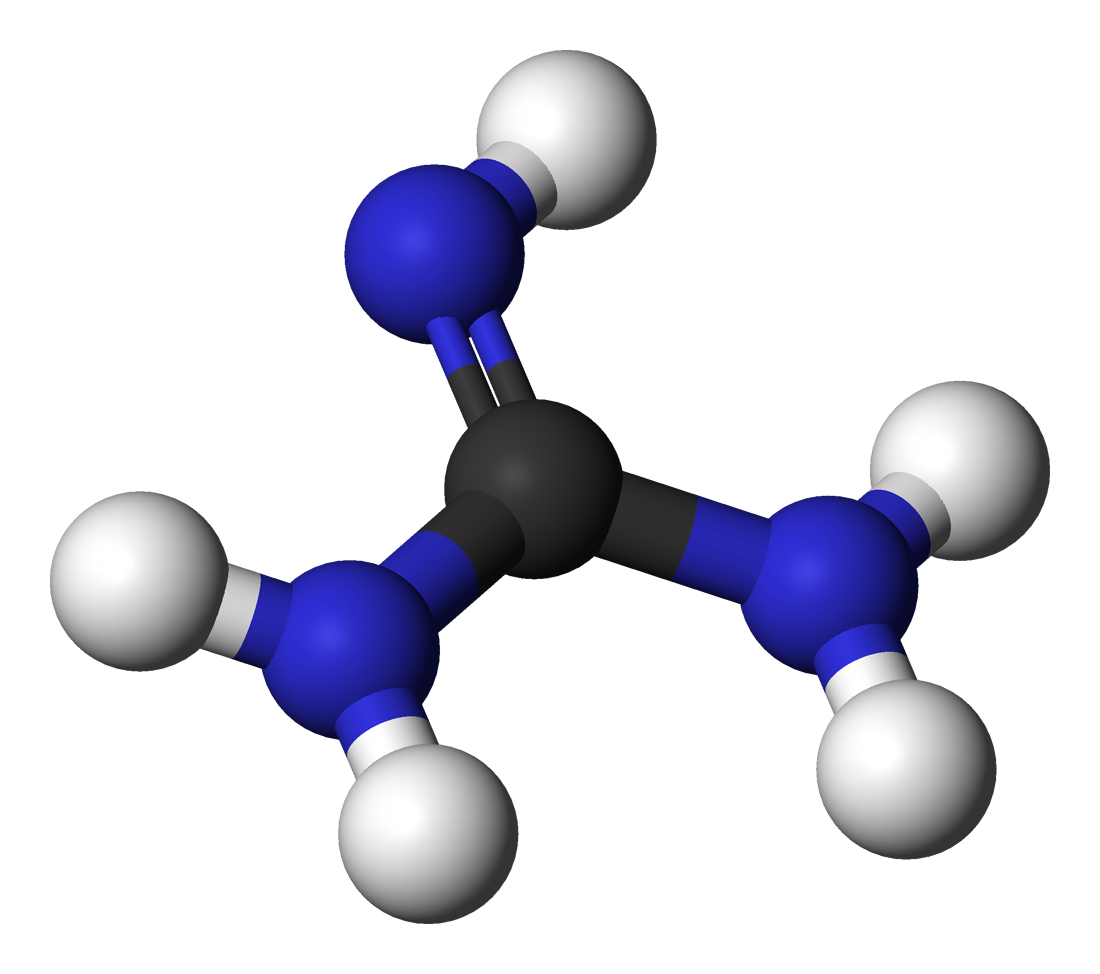
Ball and stick model of guanidine
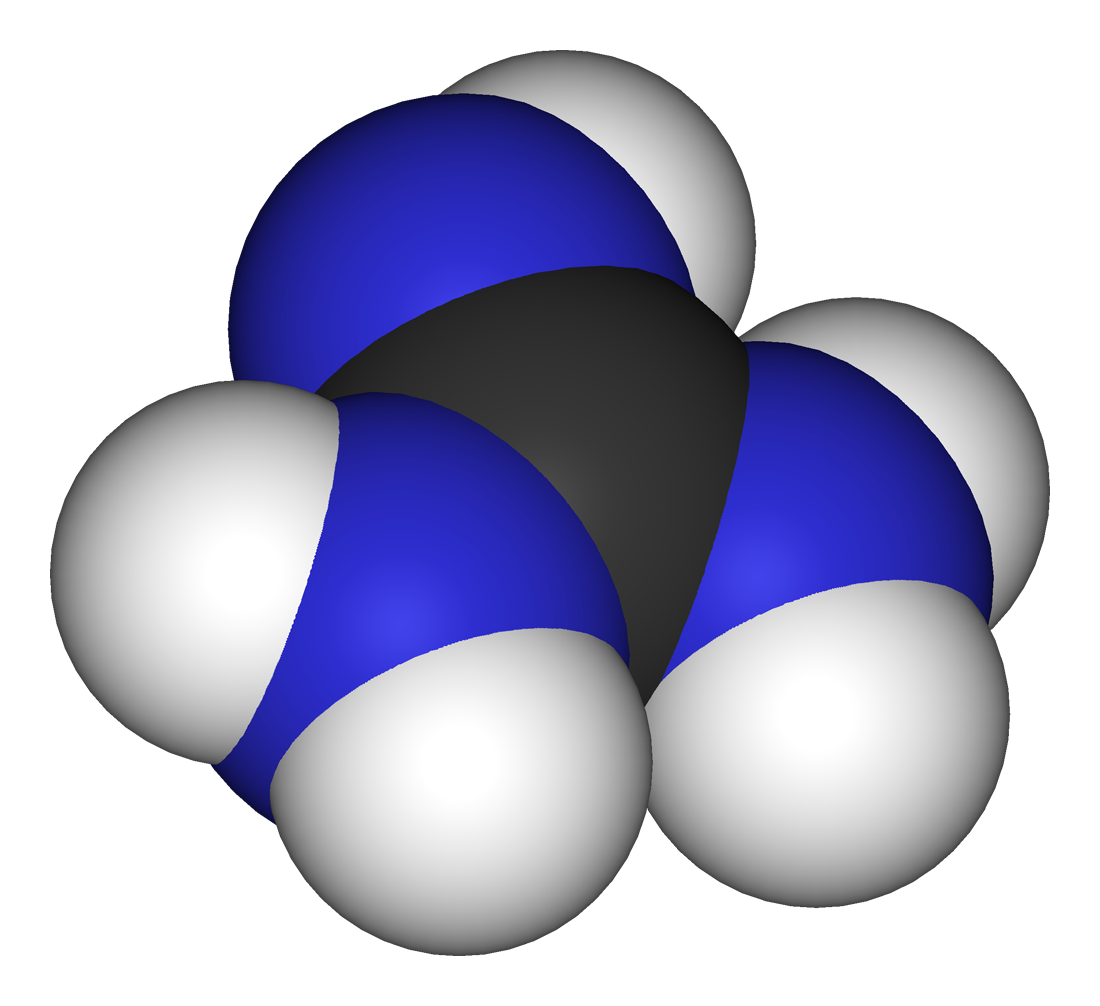
Spacefill model of guanidine

Names
- Preferred IUPAC name Guanidine
- Other names: Aminomethanamidine; Iminomethanediamine; Carbamimidamide

Identifiers
CAS Number	113-00-8
3D model (JSmol)	Interactive image
Beilstein Reference	506044
ChEBI	CHEBI:42820
ChEMBL	ChEMBL821
ChemSpider	3400
DrugBank	DB00536
ECHA InfoCard	100.003.656
EC Number	204-021-8
Gmelin Reference	100679
IUPHAR/BPS	4783
MeSH	Guanidine
PubChem CID	3520
UNII	JU58VJ6Y3B
CompTox Dashboard (EPA)	DTXSID0023117
- InChI: InChI=1S/CH5N3/c2-1(3)4/h(H5,2,3,4) Key: ZRALSGWEFCBTJO-UHFFFAOYSA-N
- SMILES: NC(N)=N

Properties
Chemical formula	CH_{5}N_{3}
Molar mass	59.072 g·mol^{−1}
Melting point	50 °C (122 °F; 323 K)
Solubility in water	18.4 mg/100 mL
log P	−1.251
Vapor pressure	4.1 mmHg (0.55 kPa)
Acidity (pK_{a})	13.6
Basicity (pK_{b})	0.4
Conjugate acid	Guanidinium

Thermochemistry
Std enthalpy of formation (Δ_{f}H^{⦵}_{298})	−56±1 kJ⋅mol^{−1}
Std enthalpy of combustion (Δ_{c}H^{⦵}_{298})	−1052.1±1 kJ⋅mol^{−1}

Pharmacology
- Pharmacokinetics
Biological half-life	7–8 hours

Hazards
- GHS labelling
Pictograms	(GHS07: Exclamation mark)
Signal word	Warning
Hazard statements	H302, H315, H319, H332

Related compounds
Related compounds	Urea; Biguanide
- Except where otherwise noted, data are given for materials in their standard state (at 25 °C [77 °F], 100 kPa). verify (what is ?) Infobox references

Guanidine is the compound with the formula HNC(NH_{2})_{2}. It is a colourless solid that dissolves in polar solvents. It is a strong base that is used in the production of plastics and explosives. It is found in urine predominantly in patients experiencing renal failure. A guanidine moiety also appears in larger organic molecules, including on the side chain of arginine.

== Structure ==
Guanidine can be thought of as a nitrogenous analogue of carbonic acid. That is, the C=O group in carbonic acid is replaced by a C=NH group, and each OH is replaced by a NH_{2} group. A detailed crystallographic analysis of guanidine was elucidated 148 years after its first synthesis, despite the simplicity of the molecule. In 2013, the positions of the hydrogen atoms and their displacement parameters were accurately determined using single-crystal neutron diffraction.

== Production ==
Guanidine can be obtained from natural sources, being first isolated in 1861 by Adolph Strecker via the oxidative degradation of an aromatic natural product, guanine, isolated from Peruvian guano.

A laboratory method of producing guanidine is gentle (180-190 °C) thermal decomposition of dry ammonium thiocyanate in anhydrous conditions:

3 NH_{4}SCN → 2 CH_{5}N_{3} + H_{2}S + CS_{2}

The commercial route involves a two step process starting with the reaction of dicyandiamide with ammonium salts. Via the intermediacy of biguanidine, this ammonolysis step affords salts of the guanidinium cation (see below). In the second step, the salt is treated with base, such as sodium methoxide.

Isothiouronium salts (S-alkylated thioureas) react with amines to give guanidinium salts:

RNH_{2} + [CH_{3}SC(NH_{2})_{2}]^{+}X^{−} → [RN(H)C(NH_{2})_{2}]^{+}X^{−} + CH_{3}SH

The resulting guanidinium ions can often be deprotonated to give the guanidine. This approach is sometimes called the Rathke synthesis, in honor of its discoverer Bernhard Rathke.

== Chemistry ==
=== Guanidinium cation ===
The conjugate acid is called the guanidinium cation, (C(NH_{2})^{+}_{3}). This planar, symmetric ion consists of three amino groups each bonded to the central carbon atom with a covalent bond of order 4/3. It is a highly stable +1 cation in aqueous solution due to the efficient resonance stabilization of the charge and efficient solvation by water molecules. As a result, its pK_{a} is 13.6 (pK_{b} of 0.4) meaning that guanidine is a very strong base in water; in neutral water, it exists almost exclusively as guanidinium. Due to this, most guanidine derivatives are salts containing the conjugate acid.

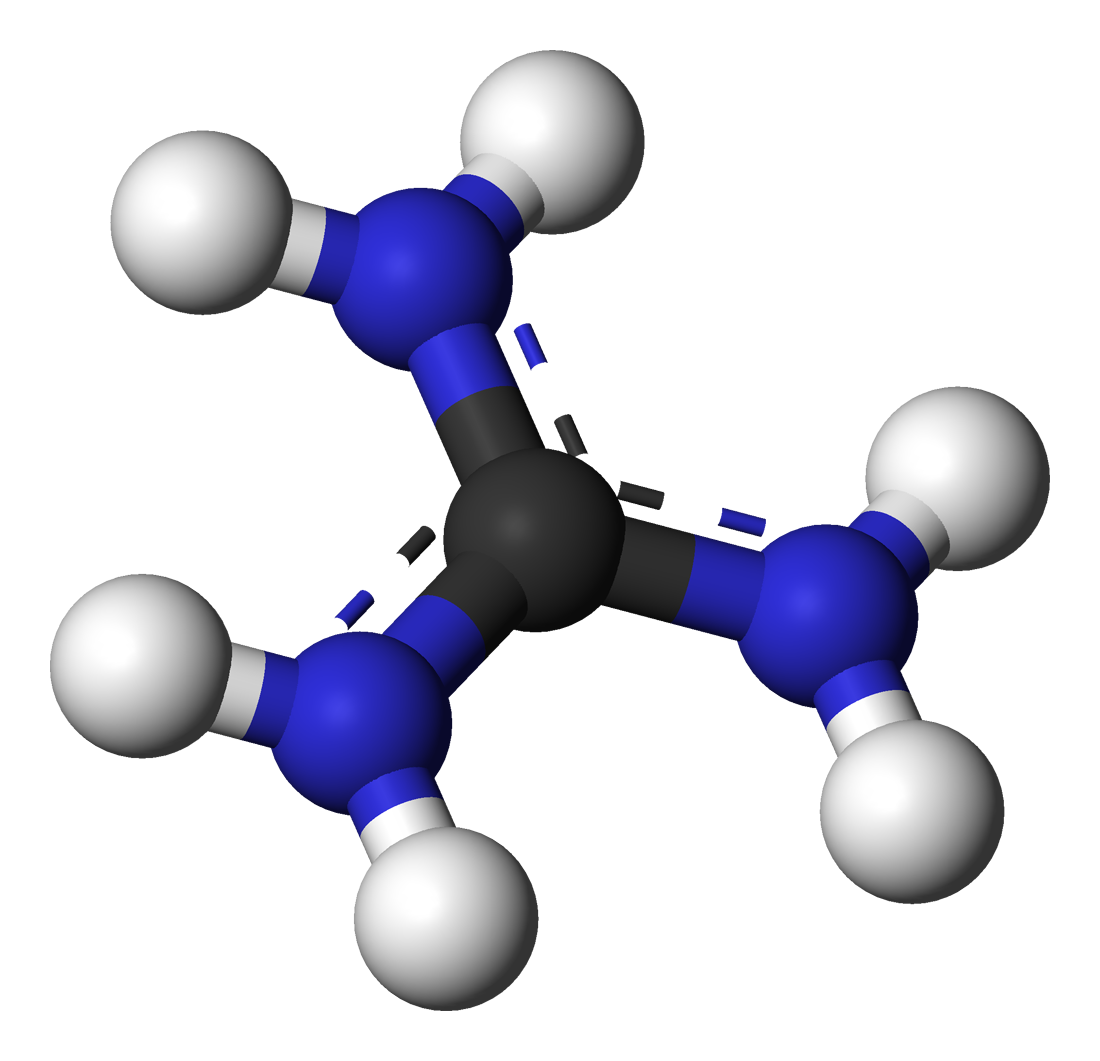
ball-and-stick model

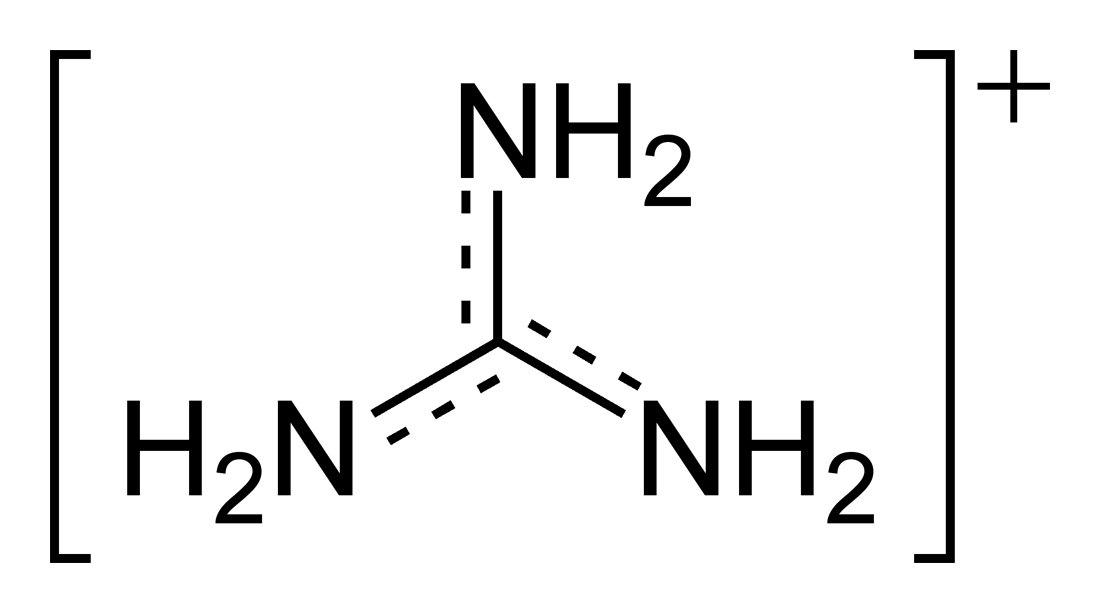
resonance hybrid

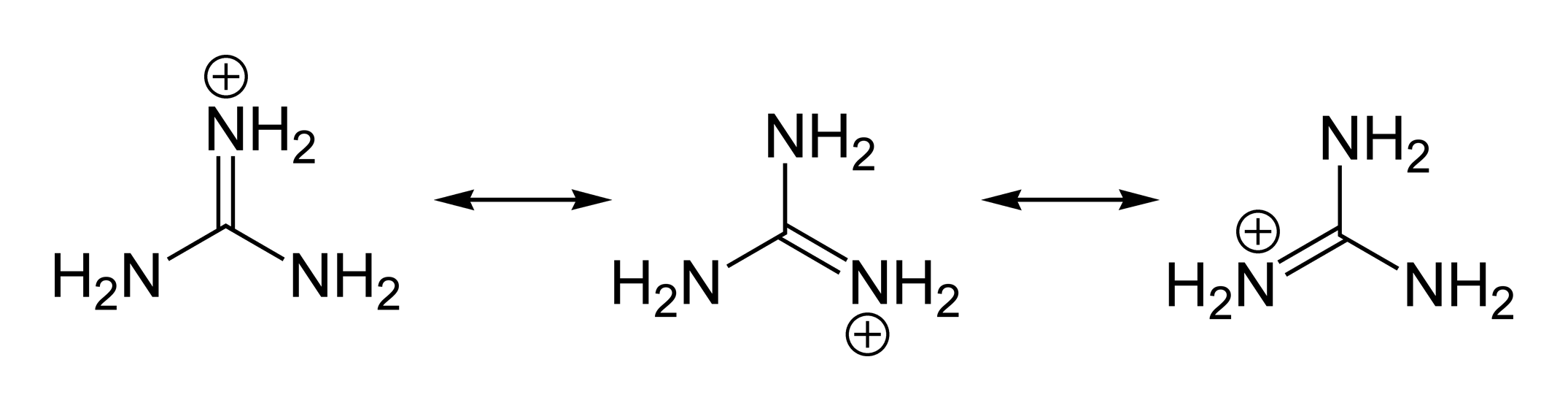
canonical forms

=== Testing ===
Guanidine can be selectively detected using sodium 1,2-naphthoquinone-4-sulfonic acid (Folin's reagent) and acidified urea.

== Uses ==
=== Industry ===
The main salt of commercial interest is the nitrate [C(NH_{2})_{3}]NO_{3}. It is used as a propellant, for example in air bags.

=== Medicine ===
Since the Middle Ages in Europe, guanidine has been used to treat diabetes as the active antihyperglycemic ingredient in French lilac. Due to its long-term hepatotoxicity, further research for blood sugar control was suspended at first after the discovery of insulin. Later development of nontoxic, safe biguanides led to the long-used first-line diabetes control medicine metformin, introduced to Europe in the 1950s & United States in 1995 and now prescribed to over 17 million patients per year in the US.

Guanidinium chloride is a now-controversial adjuvant in treatment of botulism. Recent studies have shown some significant subsets of patients who see no improvement after the administration of this drug.

=== Biochemistry ===
Guanidine exists protonated, as guanidinium, in solution at physiological pH.

Guanidinium chloride (also known as guanidine hydrochloride) has chaotropic properties and is used to denature proteins. Guanidinium chloride is known to denature proteins with a linear relationship between concentration and free energy of unfolding. In aqueous solutions containing 6 M guanidinium chloride, almost all proteins lose their entire secondary structure and become randomly coiled peptide chains.

Guanidinium thiocyanate is also used for its denaturing effect on various biological samples.

Recent studies suggest that guanidinium is produced by bacteria as a toxic byproduct. To alleviate the toxicity of guanidinium, bacteria have developed a class of transporters known as guanidinium exporters or Gdx proteins to expel the extra amounts of this ion to the outside of the cell. Gdx proteins are highly selective for guanidinium and mono-substituted guanidinyl compounds and share an overlapping set of non-canonical substrates with drug exporter EmrE.

=== Other ===
Guanidinium hydroxide is the active ingredient in some non-lye hair relaxers.

== Guanidine derivatives ==
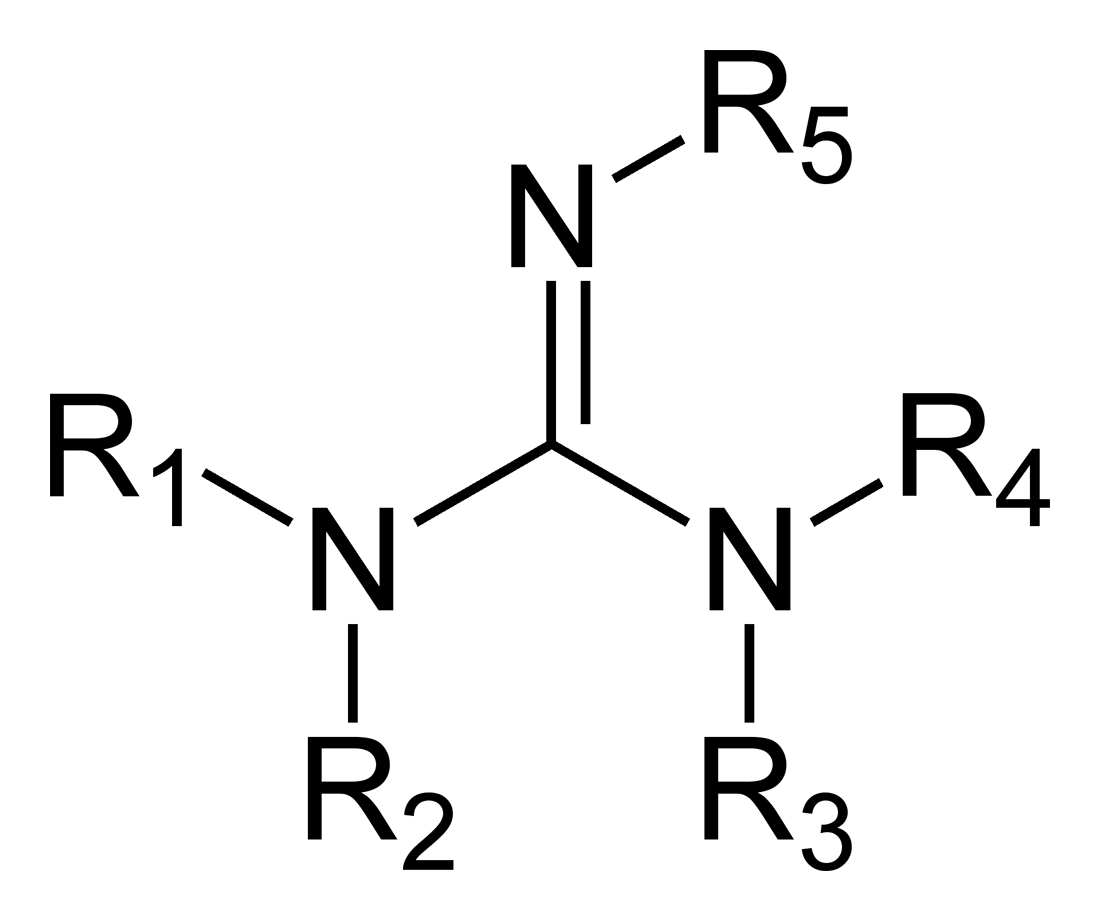
The general structure of a guanidine

Guanidines are a group of organic compounds sharing a common functional group with the general structure (R_{1}R_{2}N)(R_{3}R_{4}N)C=N−R_{5}. The central bond within this group is that of an imine, and the group is related structurally to amidines and ureas. Examples of guanidines are arginine, triazabicyclodecene, Barton's base, saxitoxin, and creatine.

One technique for persubstituted guanidine synthesis converts a urea to the diaminodichloride with phosgene and then uses the product to alkylate another amine.

Galegine is an isoamylene guanidine.

== See also ==
- Sakaguchi test
- Y-aromaticity
- Amidine
