= George Edward Day =

Welsh physician (1815–1872)

George Edward Day (1815–1872) was a Welsh physician.

== Life ==
Day was born on 4 August 1815 at Tenby, Pembrokeshire. He was the son of George Day of Manorabon House, Swansea; his father had inherited the fortunes of his own father, George Day, physician to the Nawab of Arcot, and his uncle, Sir John Day, solicitor-general in Bengal. His mother was Mary Hale. After his father's ruin by the failure of a bank in 1826, he was brought up by his grandmother, Mrs. Hale.

Day entered Trinity College, Cambridge, in 1833, and after one term obtained a scholarship at Pembroke College where he graduated in 1837. He studied medicine in Edinburgh, where he obtained several medals. He took his M.A. degree at Cambridge in 1840.

In 1843 Day began practice in London, becoming a member of the Royal College of Physicians in 1844, and a fellow in 1847. He was physician to the Western General Dispensary, and lecturer on materia medica at Middlesex Hospital. In 1849 he became Chandos Professor of Anatomy and Medicine at the University of St Andrews, and obtained the M.D. degree from the University of Giessen. He carried out reforms in the M.D. examination.

He had been elected Fellow of the Royal Society in 1850, and was a member of other learned societies. Day broke his arm in an accident on Helvellyn in 1857, and never recovered. In 1863 changes were made in St Andrews by an act of parliament, and Day retired on a pension. He settled at Torquay for his health, but became a permanent invalid.

Day died on 31 January 1872.

== Works ==
Day was a contributor to periodical literature and the publications of learned societies. His works included:

- Reports on medical subjects to William Harcourt Ranking's Half-yearly Abstract of the Medical Sciences, vols. i. ii. iii. iv. and vi.
- A translation of Johann Franz Simon's Animal Chemistry, with introduction and additions (2 vols. 1845), for the Sydenham Society.
- Translation of Julius Vogel's Pathological Anatomy of the Human Body (1 vol., 1847).
- A Practical Treatise on the Domestic Management and most important Diseases of Advanced Life (1 vol., 1851).
- Translation of Karl Gotthelf Lehmann's Physiological Chemistry for the Cavendish Society in 1851.
- Translation of Carl Rokitansky's Pathological Anatomy of the Organs of Respiration for the Sydenham Society in 1852.
- Chemistry in its relations to Physiology and Medicine, 1860.

Day contributed articles to Chambers's Encyclopædia including nearly all the articles on anatomy, physiology, and medicine from D, and all articles on chemistry from H. He published lectures and articles in the Medical Times and Gazette and The Lancet, and contributed to Nature, Chambers's Journal, All the Year Round, the Journal of Mental Science, Once a Week, and the British and Foreign Medico-Chirurgical Review.

== Family ==
In 1841 Day married Ellen Anna, daughter of James Buckton, solicitor, of Doctors' Commons and Wrexham. They had two sons and four daughters.

== See also ==
List of Welsh medical pioneers

== Notes ==
Attribution

This article incorporates text from a publication now in the public domain: Stephen, Leslie, ed. (1888). "Day, George Edward". Dictionary of National Biography. Vol. 14. London: Smith, Elder & Co.
