= Nicoletta Sacchi =

Italian oncologist

- Born: 20 September 1949; Milan, Italy
- Education: University of Milan
- Known for: Acid guanidinium thiocyanate-phenol-chloroform extraction
- Scientific career
- Fields: Biochemistry, Oncology
- Workplaces: Roswell Park Comprehensive Cancer Center

Nicoletta Sacchi (born 20 August 1949) is an Italian professor of oncology at the Roswell Park Comprehensive Cancer Center. She is the co-discoverer of the acid guanidinium thiocyanate-phenol-chloroform extraction method to extract RNA from biological samples with Trizol. As a consequence of this groundbreaking discovery she is now considered the most cited woman scientist in the world.

== Career ==
Sacchi was born in Milan and studied for her PhD at the University of Milan in 1972, investigating the genetics of yeast. She remained within the fields of genetics for her postdoctoral training at the same University and Erasmus University Rotterdam. Sacchi worked on the generation of antibody repertoires by the TdT DNA polymerase in the lab of Georges Köhler at the Basel Institute for Immunology.

She moved to the US in 1982 and switched to cancer research, focussing on the analysis of the genetics of patient samples at National Cancer Institute. This required a high yield technique to extract RNA from scarce paediatric leukemia samples, so her and colleague Piotr Chomczynski developed a new method to extract the nucleic acid. Since the publication of the technique in 1987 it has become ubiquitous in biological research, earning the paper the accolade of being one of the most cited in history.

Sacchi went back to the University of Milan in 1991 and was promoted to professor. Unsatisfied with research in Italy she spent time back in the US as a visiting professor at the Sydney Kimmel Comprehensive Cancer Center at Johns Hopkins University. In 2003 she joined the Roswell Park Comprehensive Cancer Center where she continues to study the role of genetics and the epigenome on cancer development.

Sacchi has previously criticised the culture of science in her home nation of Italy, describing the system as “fairly corrupt” and ignorant of the achievements of female scientists. She believes that this has led to brain drain of trained researchers.

== Accolades ==
In 2001, Sacchi was proclaimed a “Highly Cited Researcher in Biology and Biochemistry” by the Institute for Scientific Information in Philadelphia. In 2007, the Italian President awarded Sacchi the Commander of Merit.
