= Karl Gotthelf Lehmann =

German biochemist (1812–1863)

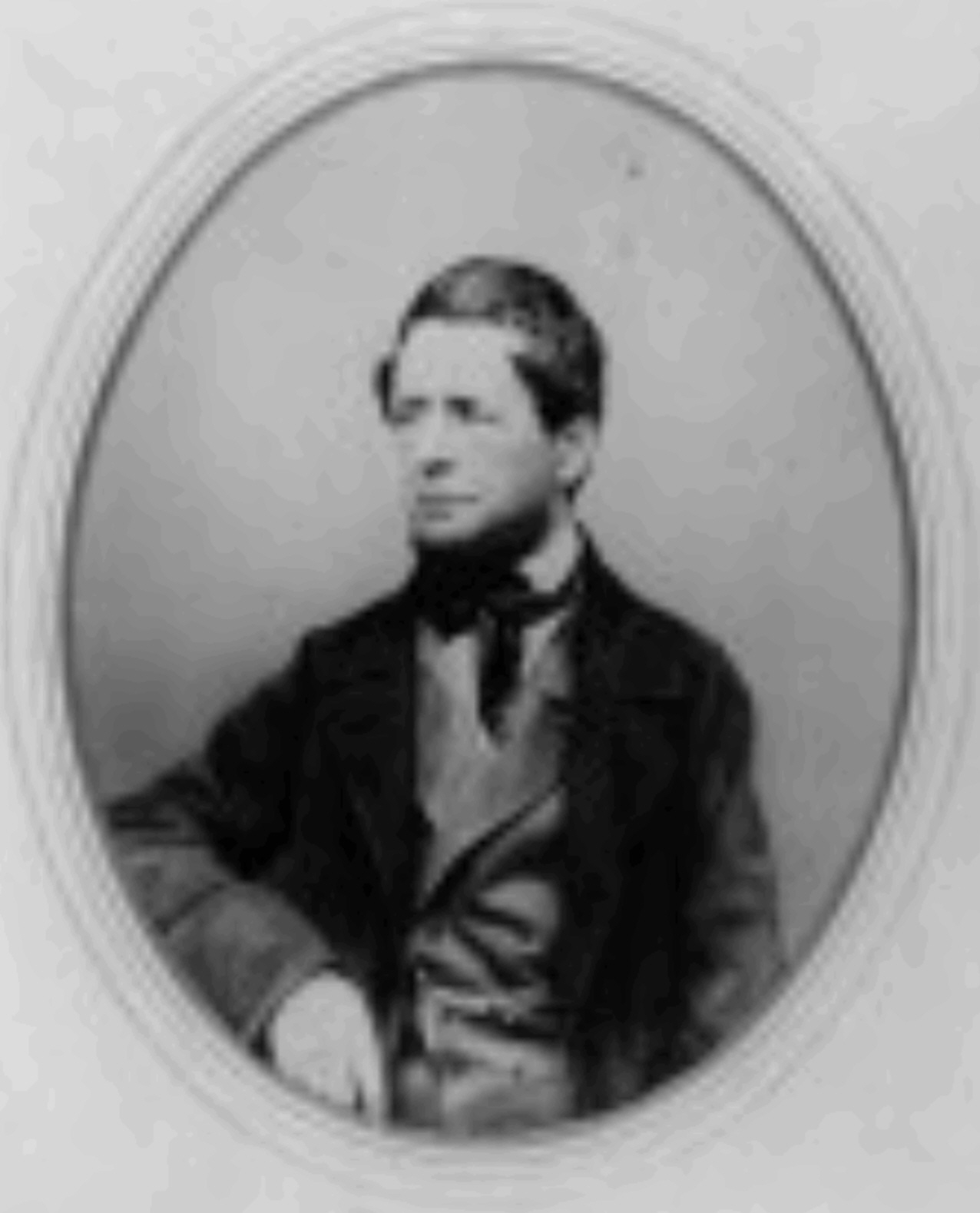
Karl Gotthelf Lehmann (ca. 1855)

Karl Gotthelf Lehmann (7 March 1812 in Leipzig – 6 January 1863 in Jena) was a German physiological chemist.

From 1830 he studied medicine at the University of Leipzig, receiving his doctorate in 1835 with a thesis titled De urina diabetica. In 1842 he became an associate professor of medicine at Leipzig, where in 1854 he was named a full professor of physiological chemistry. From 1856 to 1863 he was a professor of general chemistry at the University of Jena.

== Published works ==
His 3-volume Lehrbuch der physiologischen Chemie was translated into English by George Edward Day and published with the title, Physiological chemistry (Vol. 1; Vol. 2; Vol. 3, 1851–54). Other noted works by Lehmann include:

- Vollständiges Taschenbuch der theoretischen Chemie, 1840 – Complete handbook of theoretical chemistry.
- Einige vergleichende Analysen des Blutes der Pfortader und der Lebernerven, 1850 – Comparative analyses of the blood of the portal vein and the hepatic nerves.
- Handbuch der physiologischen Chemie, 1853 – Handbook of physiological chemistry.
- Zoochemie (edited with Karl Hugo Huppert, 1858) – Zoochemistry.

A number of his works relating to medicine and physiological chemistry were published in Otto Linné Erdmann's Journal für praktische Chemie.
