= Bernhard Rathke =

German chemist (1840–1923)

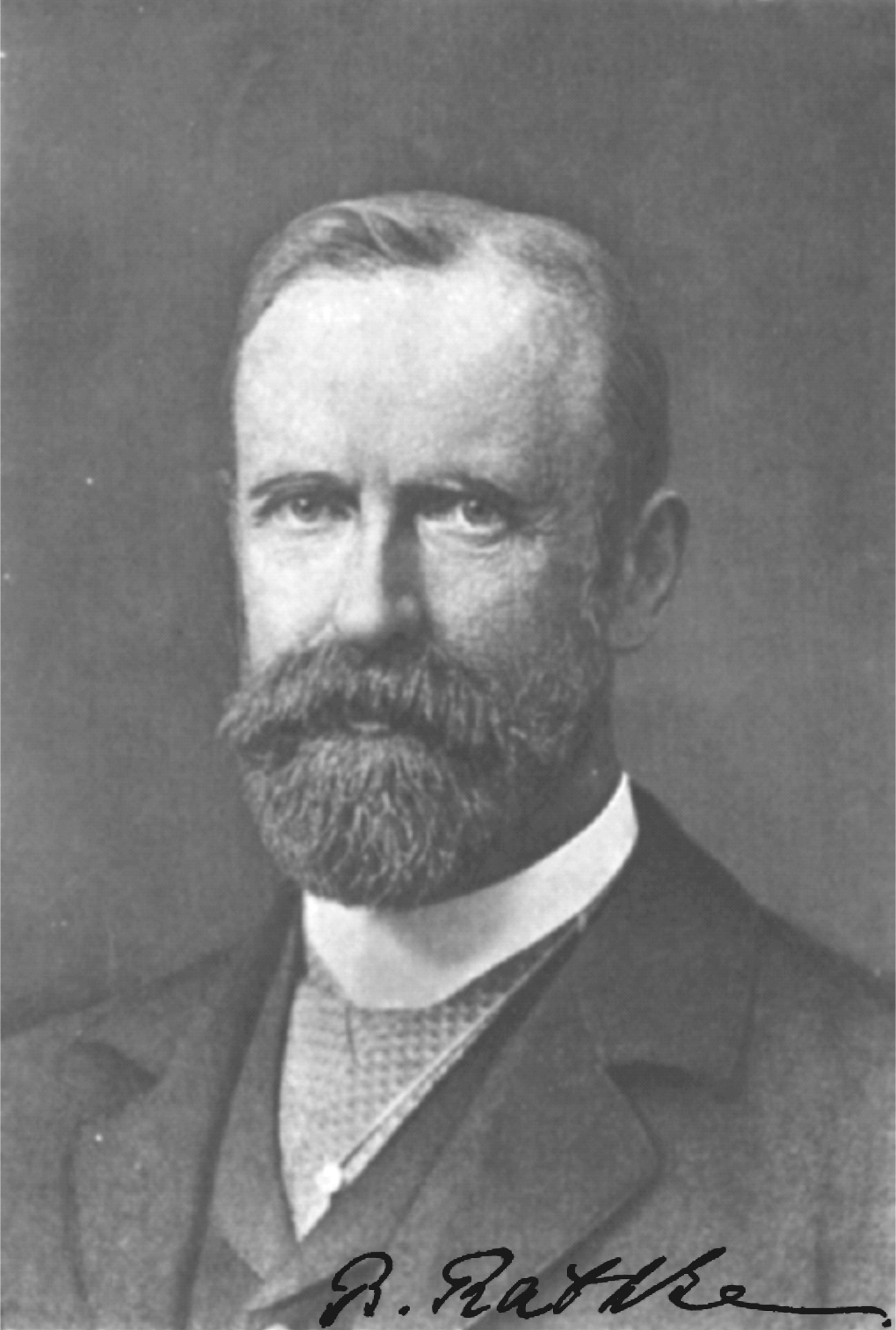
Bernhard Rathke, (ca. 1885)

Heinrich Bernhard Rathke (20 January 1840 in Königsberg – 14 August 1923 in Bad Reichenhall) was a German chemist. He was the son of embryologist Martin Rathke.

He studied natural sciences at the University of Königsberg, and afterwards worked in Robert Bunsen's laboratory at Heidelberg. In 1867 he started work as an assistant at the chemical institute of the University of Halle, and two years later obtained his habilitation with a thesis on the history of selenium. From 1873 to 1876 he taught classes in chemistry and chemical engineering at the higher vocational school in Kassel. In 1876 he became an associate professor at Halle, during this time he published what became known as the Rathke synthesis for making guanidinium groups. From 1882 to 1900, was an honorary full professor at the University of Marburg. In 1885 he became a member of the Academy of Sciences Leopoldina.

== Published works ==
- De duobus acidis selenium et sulfur una continentibus; dissertation thesis (1865).
- Beiträge zur Geschichte des Selens (1869) – Contributions to the history of selenium.
- Ueber die principien der thermochemie und ihre anwendung. (Mit besonderer berücksichtigung von Berthelot's "Essai de mécanique chimique") (1881) – On the principles of thermochemistry and its applications (With special recognition of Marcellin Berthelot's Essai de mécanique chimique).
