= Chelating resin =

Type of ion-exchange resin

Chelating resins are a class of ion-exchange resins. They are almost always used to bind cations, and utilize chelating agents covalently attached to a polymer matrix. Chelating resins have the same bead form and polymer matrix as usual ion exchangers. Their main use is for pre-concentration of metal ions in a dilute solution. Chelating ion-exchange resins are used for brine decalcification in the chlor-alkali industry, the removal of boron from potable water, and the recovery of precious metals in solutions.

== Properties and structure ==
Chelating resins operate similarly to ordinary ion-exchange resins.

A tridentate metal complex with the iminodiacetate anion, illustrating the nature of the metal-binding site in some chelating resins

Most chelating resins are polymers (copolymers to be precise) with reactive functional groups that chelate to metal ions. The variation in chelating resins arises from the nature of the chelating agents pendant from the polymer backbone. Dowex chelating resin A-1, also known as Chelex 100, is based on iminodiacetic acid in a styrene-divinylbenzene matrix. Dowex A-1 is available commercially and is widely used to determine general properties of chelating resins such as rate determining step and pH dependence, etc. Dowex A-1 is produced from chloromethylated styrene-divinylbenzene copolymer via amination with aminodiacetic acid.

Poly metal chelating resin has almost negligible affinity to both alkali and alkaline earth metals; small quantities of resin can be utilized to concentrate trace metals in natural water systems or biological fluids, in which there are three or four orders of magnitude greater alkali and alkaline earth metal concentration than the trace metal concentrations.

Other functional groups bound to chelating resins are aminophosphonic acids, thiourea, and 2-picolylamine.

== Application in heavy metal remediation ==
Soil contaminated with heavy metals including radionuclides is mitigated primarily using chelating resins.

Chelating polymers (ion-exchange resins) were proposed for maintenance therapy of pathologies accompanied by iron accumulation, such as hereditary hemochromatosis (iron overload) or Wilson's disease (copper overload), by chelating the metal ions in GIT and thus limiting its biological availability.

== Additional resources ==
1. Yang, Dong, Xijun Chang, Yongwen Liu, and Sui Wang. "Synthesis and Efficiency of a Spherical Macroporous Epoxy-Polyamide Chelating Resin for Preconcentrating and Separating Trace Noble Metal Ions." Annali di Chimica 95.1-2 (2005): 111-14.
2. Zougagh, Mohammed, J. M. Cano Pav N, and A. Garcia De Torres. "Chelating Sorbents Based on Silica Gel and Their Application in Atomic Spectrometry." Anal Bioanal Chem Analytical and Bioanalytical Chemistry 381.6 (2005): 1103-113.
3. R. R. Greenberg" and H. M. Kingston. "Trace Element Analysis of Natural Water Samples by Neutron Activation Analysis with Chelating Resin." Center for Analytical Chemistry, National Bureau of Standards, Washington, D.C. 20234.
4. Roy, P. K.; Rawat, A. S.; Choudhary, V.; Rai, P. K. (2004-11-15). "Synthesis and analytical application of a chelating resin based on a crosslinked styrene/maleic acid copolymer for the extraction of trace-metal ions". Journal of Applied Polymer Science. 94 (4): 1771–1779. doi:10.1002/app.21109. ISSN 1097-4628..
