= Karl Hugo Huppert =

German chemist and physician (1832–1904)

- Born: 29 January 1832; Marienberg, Kingdom of Saxony
- Died: 19 October 1904 (aged 72); Prague
- Education: University of Leipzig; University of Jena
- Scientific career
- Fields: medicine, chemistry
- Workplaces: University of Leipzig; University of Prague

Karl Hugo Huppert (29 January 1832 – 19 October 1904) was a German chemist and physician.

== Life and achievements ==
Karl Hugo Huppert, son of a wood turner and merchant, Christian Huppert, studied in Leipzig as a pupil of Karl Gotthelf Lehmann (1812–1863), and also at the University of Jena. In 1860 he was appointed head of the chemical laboratory of the Jakob Hospital in Leipzig. In 1862 he took his doctoral examination in medicine, and in the same year acquired his postdoctoral qualification in biochemistry and was in charge of what was then called the “zoochemisches laboratorium”.

He took up teaching at the university for the next ten years.
While still in Leipzig, Huppert became professor ordinarius in 1872, but the same year he accepted a call to Prague for the newly established chair of applied medicinal chemistry at Charles University, and became to first to teach the new discipline in 1872.

Among the many issues in physiological and pathological chemistry he worked on, he was mainly concerned with the formation of the body's own substances like hemoglobin, bilirubin and glycogen. He documented his findings in numerous publications. Among his pupils were eminent researchers, e. g. Rudolf von Jaksch, Otto Kahler and Franz Hofmeister.
Huppert was engaged in a committee of the faculty concerned with restructuring the program of medical study.
In 1878/79 and 1902/03 he was dean of the medical faculty and in 1895/96 he was rector of the university.
