= Acid guanidinium thiocyanate-phenol-chloroform extraction =

RNA partitions in the aqueous phase, while proteins and DNA partition into the organic/interphase (left). The RNA is then precipitated in an alcohol (right).

Acid guanidinium thiocyanate-phenol-chloroform extraction (abbreviated AGPC) is a liquid–liquid extraction technique in biochemistry and molecular biology. It is widely used for isolating RNA (as well as DNA and protein in some cases). This method may take longer than a column-based system such as the silica-based purification, but has higher purity and the advantage of high recovery of RNA. Furthermore, an RNA column is typically unsuitable for purification of short (<200 nucleotides) RNA species, such as siRNA, miRNA and tRNA.

It was originally devised by Piotr Chomczynski and Nicoletta Sacchi, who published their protocol in 1987. The reagent is sold by Sigma-Aldrich by the name TRI Reagent; by Invitrogen under the name TRIzol; by Bioline as Trisure; and by Tel-Test as STAT-60.

== How it works ==
This method relies on phase separation by centrifugation of a mixture of the aqueous sample and a solution containing water-saturated phenol and chloroform, resulting in an upper aqueous phase and a lower organic phase (mainly phenol). Guanidinium thiocyanate, a chaotropic agent, is added to the organic phase to aid in the denaturation of proteins (such as those that strongly bind nucleic acids or those that degrade RNA). The nucleic acids (RNA and/or DNA) partition into the aqueous phase, while protein partitions into the organic phase. The pH of the mixture determines which nucleic acids get purified. Under acidic conditions (pH 4-6), DNA partitions into the organic phase while RNA remains in the aqueous phase. Under neutral conditions (pH 7-8), both DNA and RNA partition into the aqueous phase. In a last step, the nucleic acids are recovered from the aqueous phase by precipitation with 2-propanol. The 2-propanol is then washed with ethanol and the pellet briefly air-dried and dissolved in TE buffer or RNAse free water.

Guanidinium thiocyanate denatures proteins, including RNases, and separates rRNA from ribosomal proteins, while phenol, isopropanol and water are solvents with poor solubility. In the presence of chloroform or BCP (bromochloropropane), these solvents separate entirely into two phases that are recognized by their color: a clear, upper aqueous phase (containing the nucleic acids) and a lower phase (containing the proteins dissolved in phenol and the lipids dissolved in chloroform). Other denaturing chemicals such as 2-mercaptoethanol and sarcosine may also be used. The major downside is that phenol and chloroform are both hazardous and inconvenient materials, and the extraction is often laborious, so in recent years many companies now offer alternative ways to isolate RNA.

=== Reagents ===
- Phenol: The phenol used for biochemistry comes as a water-saturated solution with Tris buffer, as a Tris-buffered 50% phenol, 50% chloroform solution, or as a Tris-buffered 50% phenol, 48% chloroform, 2% isoamyl alcohol solution (sometimes called "25:24:1"). Phenol is naturally somewhat water-soluble, and gives a fuzzy interface, which is sharpened by the presence of chloroform, and the isoamyl alcohol reduces foaming. Most solutions also have an antioxidant, as oxidized phenol damages the nucleic acids. For RNA purification, the pH is kept at around 4, which retains RNA in the aqueous phase preferentially. For DNA purification, the pH is usually near 7, at which point all nucleic acids are found in the aqueous phase.
- Chloroform: Chloroform is stabilized with small quantities of amylene or ethanol, because exposure of pure chloroform to oxygen and ultraviolet light produces phosgene gas. Some chloroform solutions come as pre-made a 96% chloroform, 4% isoamyl alcohol mixture that can be mixed with an equal volume of phenol to obtain the 25:24:1 solution.
- Isoamyl alcohol: Isoamyl alcohol may reduce foaming and ensure deactivation of RNases.

== See also ==
- Column-based nucleic acid purification
- Nucleic acid methods
- Ethanol precipitation
- DNA separation by silica adsorption
