= Chaotropic activity =

Disordering of biological structures

Chaotropicity describes the entropic disordering of lipid bilayers and other biomacromolecules which is caused by substances dissolved in water. According to the original usage and work carried out on cellular stress mechanisms and responses, chaotropic substances do not necessarily disorder the structure of water.

The chaotropic activities of solutes in the aqueous phase (e.g. ethanol, butanol, urea, MgCl_{2}, and phenol) have been quantified using an agar-gelation assay. Whereas chaotropicity was first applied to studies of ions, it is equally applicable to alcohols, aromatics, ion mixtures, and other solutes. Furthermore, hydrophobic substances known to stress cellular systems (including benzene and toluene) can chaotropically disorder macromolecules and induce a chaotrope-stress response in microbial cells, even though they partition into the hydrophobic domains of macromolecular systems.

== See also ==
- Chaotropic agent
- Hofmeister series
