= Kosmotropic =

Agents which contribute to stability of water-water interactions

Co-solvents (in water solvent) are defined as kosmotropic (order-making) if they contribute to the stability and structure of water-water interactions. In contrast, chaotropic (disorder-making) agents have the opposite effect, disrupting water structure, increasing the solubility of nonpolar solvent particles, and destabilizing solute aggregates. Kosmotropes cause water molecules to favorably interact, which in effect stabilizes intramolecular interactions in macromolecules such as proteins.

== Ionic kosmotropes ==
Ionic kosmotropes tend to be small or have high charge density. Some ionic kosmotropes are CO^{2−}_{3}, SO^{2−}_{4}, HPO^{2−}_{4}, Mg^{2+}, Li^{+}, Zn^{2+} and Al^{3+}. Large ions or ions with low charge density (such as Br^{−}, I^{−}, K^{+}, Cs^{+}) instead act as chaotropes. Kosmotropic anions are more polarizable and hydrate more strongly than kosmotropic cations of the same charge density.

A scale can be established if one refers to the Hofmeister series or looks up the free energy of hydrogen bonding ($\Delta G_{\rm HB}$) of the salts, which quantifies the extent of hydrogen bonding of an ion in water. For example, the kosmotropes CO^{2−}_{3} and OH^{−} have $\Delta G_{\rm HB}$ between 0.1 and 0.4 J/mol, whereas the chaotrope SCN^{−} has a $\Delta G_{\rm HB}$ between −1.1 and −0.9.

Recent simulation studies have shown that the variation in solvation energy between the ions and the surrounding water molecules underlies the mechanism of the Hofmeister series. Thus, ionic kosmotropes are characterized by strong solvation energy leading to an increase of the overall cohesiveness of the solution, which is also reflected by the increase of the viscosity and density of the solution.

== Applications ==
Ammonium sulfate is the traditional kosmotropic salt for the salting out of protein from an aqueous solution. Kosmotropes are used to induce protein aggregation in pharmaceutical preparation and at various stages of protein extraction and purification.

== Nonionic kosmotropes ==
Nonionic kosmotropes have no net charge but are very soluble and become very hydrated. Carbohydrates such as trehalose and glucose, as well as proline and tert-butanol, are kosmotropes.

== See also ==
- Chaotropic agent and guanidinium chloride
- Protein precipitation, on ammonium sulfate "salting out"
