= Franz Hofmeister =

German chemist (1850–1922)

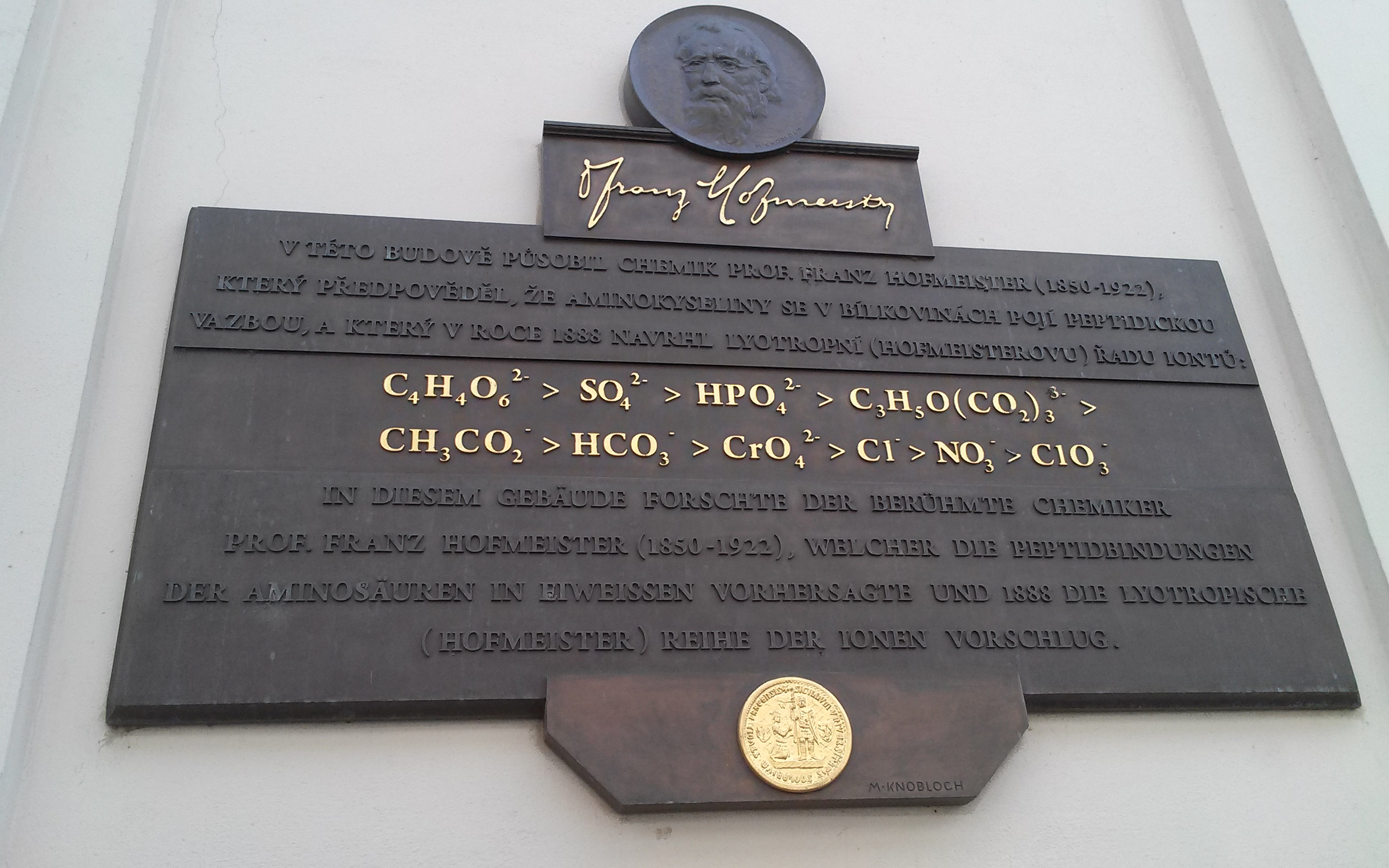
Plaque to Franz Hofmeister at the First Faculty of Medicine, Charles University in Prague

Franz Hofmeister (30 August 1850, in Prague – 26 July 1922, in Würzburg) was an early protein scientist, and is famous for his studies of salts that influence the solubility and conformational stability of proteins. In 1902, Hofmeister became the first to propose that polypeptides were amino acids linked by peptide bonds, although this model of protein primary structure was independently and simultaneously conceived by Emil Fischer.

== Early life ==
Hofmeister's father was a doctor in Prague, where Hofmeister first began his studies, under the physiologist Karl Hugo Huppert, himself a student of Carl Lehmann. Hofmeister's Habilitationsschrift in 1879 concerned the peptic products of digestion.

Hofmeister became a Professor of Pharmacology at the First Faculty of Medicine, Charles University in Prague in 1885, then eventually moved to Strasbourg in 1896.

== The Hofmeister series ==
Hofmeister discovered a series of salts that have consistent effects on the solubility of proteins and (it was discovered later) on the stability of their secondary and tertiary structure. Anions appear to have a larger effect than cations, and are usually ordered

$$\mathrm{F^{-} \approx SO_{4}^{2-} > HPO_{4}^{2-} > acetate > Cl^{-} > NO_{3}^{-} > Br^{-} > ClO_{3}^{-} > I^{-} > ClO_{4}^{-} > SCN^{-}}$$

(This is a partial listing; many more salts have been studied.) The order of cations is usually given as

$$\mathrm{NH_{4}^{+} > K^{+} > Na^{+} > Li^{+} > Mg^{2+} > Ca^{2+} > guanidinium}$$

The mechanism of the Hofmeister series is not entirely clear, but seems to result mainly from effects on the solvent at higher salt concentrations (> 100 mM). Early members of the series increase solvent surface tension and decrease the solubility of nonpolar molecules (salt out); in effect, they strengthen the hydrophobic interaction. By contrast, later salts in the series increase the solubility of nonpolar molecules (salt in) and decrease the order in water; in effect, they weaken the hydrophobic effect. However, these salts also interact directly with proteins (which are charged and have strong dipole moments) and may even bind specifically (e.g., phosphate and sulfate binding to ribonuclease A). Ions that have a strong salting in effect such as I^{−} and SCN^{−} are strong denaturants, because they salt in the peptide group, and thus interact much more strongly with the unfolded form of a protein than with its native form. Consequently, they pull the unfolding reaction. Moreover, they may have direct interactions with some standard hydrophobic molecules, e.g., benzene. A quantum chemical investigation suggests an electrostatic origin of the Hofmeister series, which appears to quantify this qualitative series (at least for anions).

== Protein purification ==
The importance of the Hofmeister series to early protein work should not be underestimated, since it provided the chief tool for purifying proteins (sulfate precipitation) over the next ~50 years, one that is still in use today. Hofmeister himself may have been the first to crystallize a protein, hen egg-white albumin. Repeated crystallization was a favourite purification technique in the early days of protein science, and was essential for its development.

== Proposal of protein primary structure ==
Hofmeister argued for peptide bonds by process of elimination. C-C, ether and ester bonds were unlikely considering the digestion by trypsin. R=C-N-C=R bonds could be eliminated because it would imply a much larger number of carboxylate groups than is observed experimentally.

Hofmeister also argued for peptide bonds based on the biuret reaction observed with all proteins but never with free amino acids. Since biuret has the formula NH_{2}-CO-NH-CO-NH_{2}, that suggested the presence of similar peptide bonds in proteins.

== See also ==
- primary structure
- peptide bond
- Picture of Hofmeister at Science and Society site, UK
- Hofmeister Still Mystifies, Chemical & Engineering News, July 16, 2012.
