= Salting out =

Purification technique

Salting out (also known as salt-induced precipitation, salt fractionation, anti-solvent crystallization, precipitation crystallization, or drowning out) is a purification technique that utilizes the reduced solubility of certain molecules in a solution of very high ionic strength. Salting out is typically used to precipitate large biomolecules, such as proteins or DNA. Because the salt concentration needed for a given protein to precipitate out of the solution differs from protein to protein, a specific salt concentration can be used to precipitate a target protein. This process is also used to concentrate dilute solutions of proteins. Dialysis can be used to remove the salt if needed.

== Principle ==
Salt compounds dissociate in aqueous solutions. This property is exploited in the process of salting out. When the salt concentration is increased, some of the water molecules are attracted by the salt ions, which decreases the number of water molecules available to interact with the charged part of the protein.

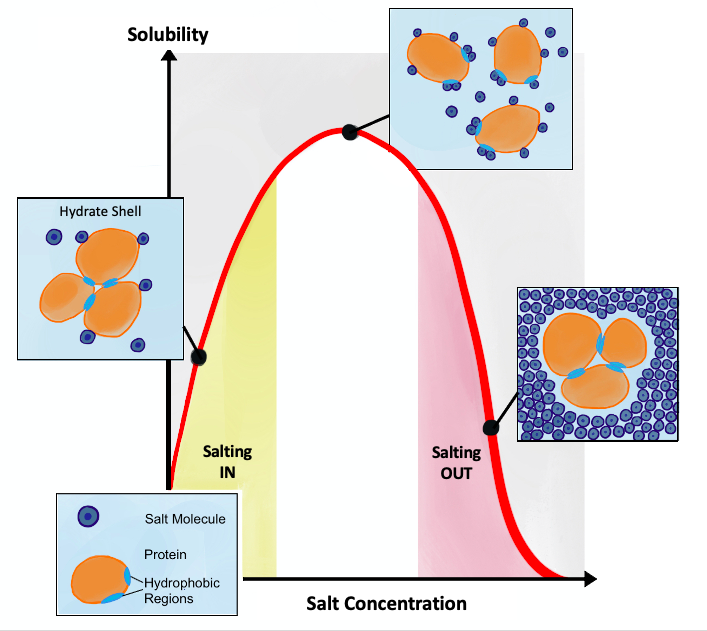
The principle of salting in and salting out technique, based on increasing salt concentration.

There are hydrophobic amino acids and hydrophilic amino acids in protein molecules. After protein folding in aqueous solution, hydrophobic amino acids usually form protected hydrophobic areas while hydrophilic amino acids interact with the molecules of solvation and allow proteins to form hydrogen bonds with the surrounding water molecules. If enough of the protein surface is hydrophilic, the protein can be dissolved in water.

When salt is added to the solution, there is more frequent interaction between solvent molecules and salt ions. As a result, the protein and salt ions compete to interact with the solvent molecules with the result that there are fewer solvent molecules available for interaction with the protein molecules than before. The protein–protein interactions thus become stronger than the solvent–solute interactions and the protein molecules associate by forming hydrophobic interactions with each other. After dissociation in a given solvent, the negatively charged atoms from a chosen salt begin to compete for interactions with positively charged molecules present in the solution. Similarly, the positively charged cations compete for interactions with the negatively charged molecules of the solvent. This process is known as salting out.

Soaps are easily precipitated by concentrated salt solution, the metal ion in the salt reacts with the fatty acids forming back the soap and glycerin (glycerol). To separate glycerin from the soap, the pasty boiling mass is treated with brine (NaCl solution). Contents of the kettle salt out (separate) into an upper layer that is a curdy mass of impure soap and a lower layer that consists of an aqueous salt solution with the glycerin dissolved in it. The slightly alkaline salt solution, termed spent lye, is extracted from the bottom of the pan or kettle and may be subsequently treated for glycerin recovery.

== Application ==
As different proteins have different compositions of amino acids, different protein molecules precipitate at different concentrations of salt solution.

Unwanted proteins can be removed from a protein solution mixture by salting out as long as the solubility of the protein in various concentrations of salt solution is known. After removing the precipitate by filtration or centrifugation, the desired protein can be precipitated by altering the salt concentration to the level at which the desired protein becomes insoluble.

One demerit of salting out in purification of proteins is that, in addition to precipitating a specific protein of interest, contaminants are also precipitated as well. Thus to obtain a purer protein of interest, additional purification methods such as ion exchange chromatography may be required.

== See also ==
- Ionic strength
- Protein precipitation
- Salting in
- Ammonium sulfate precipitation
- Hofmeister series
