= Salting in =

Effect where increased ionic strength results in increased solubility

Salting in refers to the effect where increasing the ionic strength of a solution increases the solubility of a solute, such as a protein. This effect tends to be observed at lower ionic strengths.

Protein solubility is a complex function of physicochemical nature of the protein, pH, temperature, and the concentration of the salt used. It also depends on whether the salt is kosmotropic, whereby the salt will stabilize water. The solubility of proteins usually increases slightly in the presence of salt, referred to as "salting in". However, at high concentrations of salt, the solubility of the proteins drop sharply and proteins can precipitate out, referred to as "salting out".

== Anionic interactions ==
Initial salting in at low concentrations is explained by the Debye–Huckel theory. Proteins are surrounded by the salt counterions (ions of opposite net charge) and this screening results in decreasing electrostatic free energy of the protein and increasing activity of the solvent, which in turn leads to increasing solubility. This theory predicts that the logarithm of solubility is proportional to the square root of the ionic strength.

The behavior of proteins in solutions at high salt concentrations is explained by John Gamble Kirkwood. The abundance of the salt ions decreases the solvating power of salt ions, resulting in the decrease in the solubility of the proteins and precipitation results.

At high salt concentrations, the solubility is given by the following empirical expression.

log S = B − KI

where S is the solubility of the protein, B is a constant (function of protein, pH and temperature), K is the salting out constant (function of pH, mixing and salt), and I is the ionic strength of the salt. This expression is an approximation to that proposed by Long and McDevit.

== See also ==
- Salting out
- Solvation shell
