= Maintenance therapy =

Medical treatment

Maintenance therapy is a medical therapy that is designed to help a primary treatment succeed. For example, maintenance chemotherapy may be given to people who have a cancer in remission in an attempt to prevent a relapse. This form of treatment is also a common approach for the management of many incurable, chronic diseases such as periodontal disease, Crohn's disease or ulcerative colitis.

== Challenges and Management ==
The success of maintenance therapy relies heavily on patient adherence, which can be difficult to sustain over long periods, particularly when a patient is in remission or asymptomatic. Research indicates that approximately 50% of patients with chronic conditions do not adhere to their prescribed maintenance regimens. Common barriers include forgetfulness, the complexity of the treatment schedule, and a lack of immediate symptoms, which can lead patients to underestimate the necessity of continued therapy. To address these challenges, healthcare providers often recommend behavioral strategies and digital health interventions. Simple tools such as SMS reminders, mobile applications for tracking, and electronic monitoring devices have been shown to significantly improve adherence by helping patients establish consistent routines.
