= Guanidinium chloride =

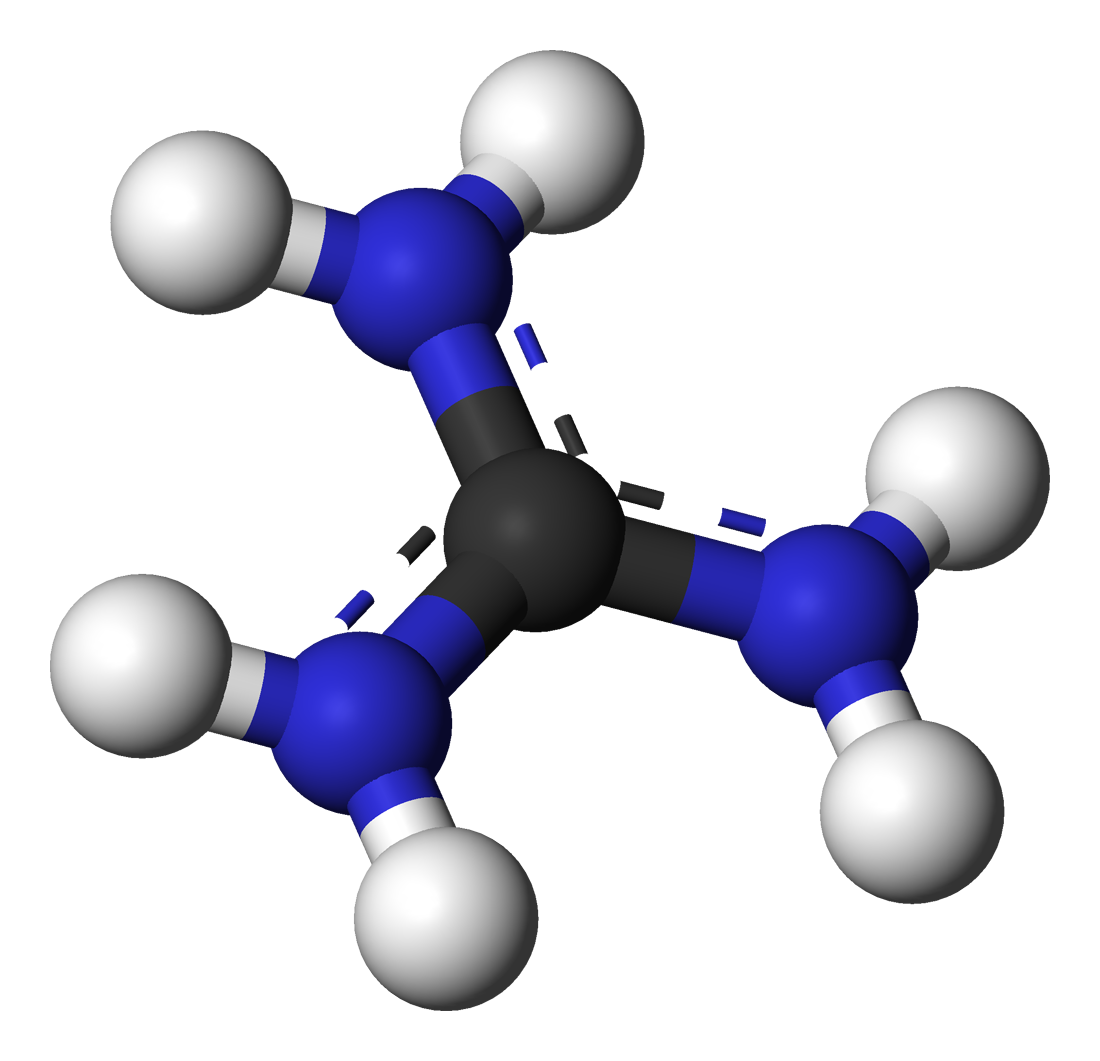

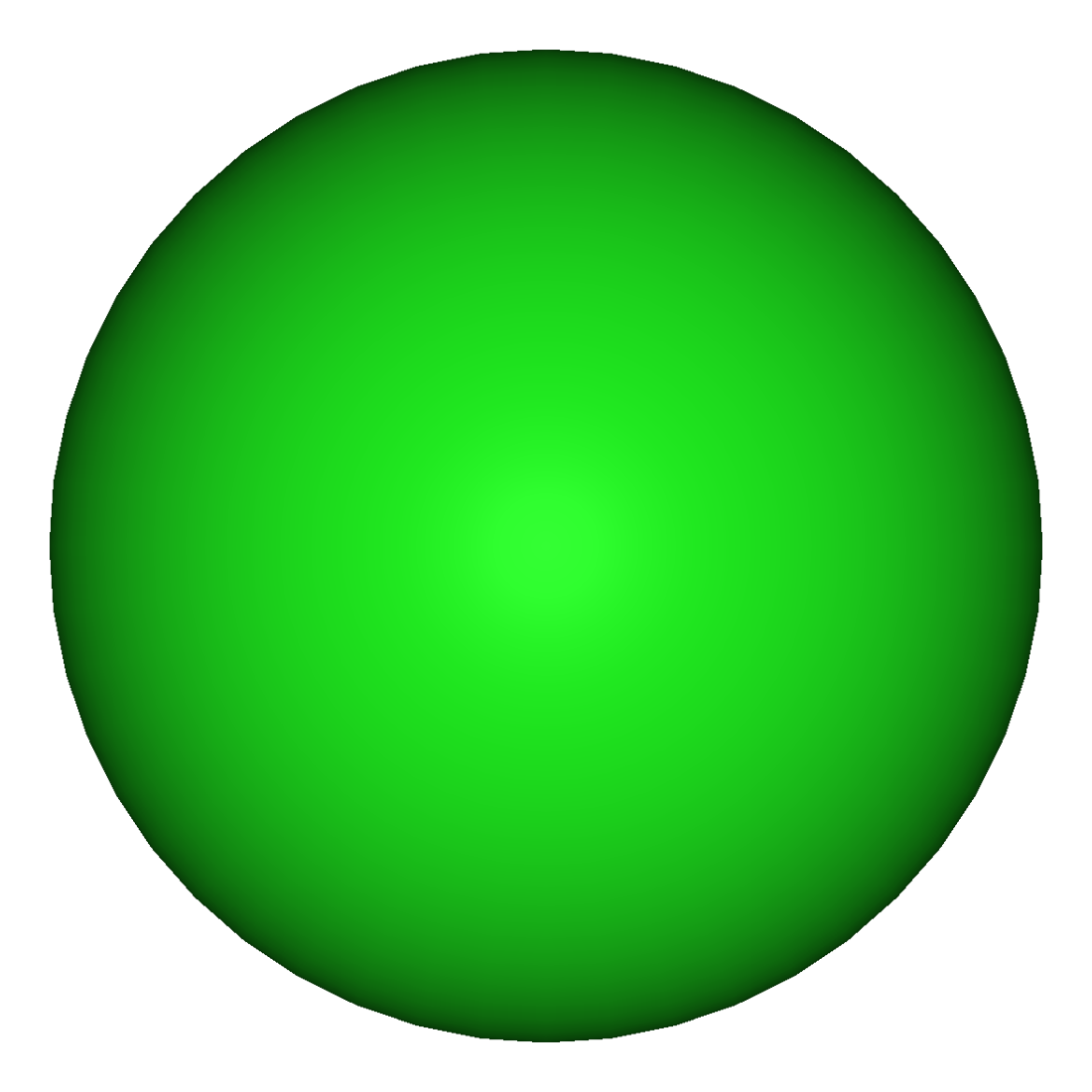

Names
- IUPAC name Carbamimidoylazanium chloride
- Other names Guanidine hydrochloride

Identifiers
CAS Number	50-01-1
3D model (JSmol)	Interactive image
ChEBI	CHEBI:32735
ChemSpider	5540
ECHA InfoCard	100.000.003
KEGG	D11626
PubChem CID	5742
UNII	3YQC9ZY4YB
CompTox Dashboard (EPA)	DTXSID7058757
- InChI: InChI=1S/CH5N3.ClH/c2-1(3)4;/h(H5,2,3,4);1H Key: PJJJBBJSCAKJQF-UHFFFAOYSA-N; InChI=1/CH5N3.ClH/c2-1(3)4;/h(H5,2,3,4);1H Key: PJJJBBJSCAKJQF-UHFFFAOYAG
- SMILES: Cl.[N@H]=C(N)N

Properties
Chemical formula	CH_{6}ClN_{3}
Molar mass	95.53 g·mol^{−1}
Appearance	Orthorhombic bipyramidal crystals
Density	1.354 g/cm^{3} at 20 °C
Melting point	182.3 °C (360.1 °F; 455.4 K)
Solubility in water	2.15 g/ml at 20 °C
Acidity (pK_{a})	13.6

Hazards
- GHS labelling
Pictograms	(GHS07: Exclamation mark)
Signal word	Warning
Hazard statements	H302, H315, H319
Precautionary statements	P264, P264+P265, P270, P280, P301+P317, P302+P352, P305+P351+P338, P321, P330, P332+P317, P337+P317, P362+P364, P501
Safety data sheet (SDS)	External MSDS
- Except where otherwise noted, data are given for materials in their standard state (at 25 °C [77 °F], 100 kPa). verify (what is ?) Infobox references

Guanidinium chloride or guanidine hydrochloride, usually abbreviated GdmCl and sometimes GdnHCl or GuHCl, is the hydrochloride salt of guanidine.

== Structure ==
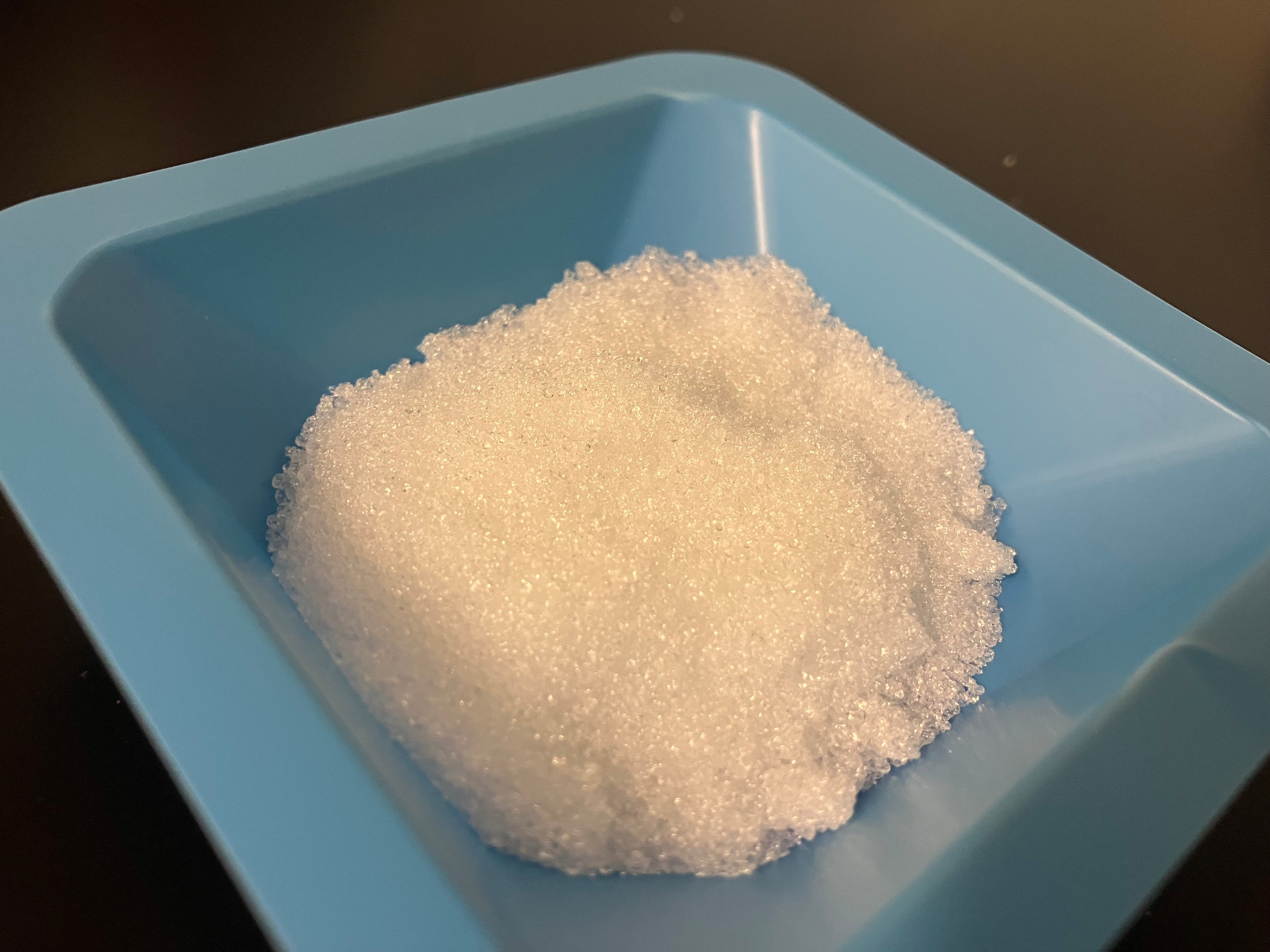
Guanidinium chloride on a weighing boat

Guanidinium chloride crystallizes in orthorhombic space group Pbca. The crystal structure consists of a network of guanidinium cations and chloride anions linked by N–H···Cl hydrogen bonds.

== Acidity ==
Guanidinium chloride is a weak acid with a pK_{a} of 13.6. The reason that it is such a weak acid is the complete delocalization of the positive charge through three nitrogen atoms (plus a little bit of positive charge on carbon). However, some stronger bases can deprotonate it, such as sodium hydroxide:

C(NH_{2})^{+}_{3} + OH^{−} ⇌ HNC(NH_{2})_{2} + H_{2}O

The equilibrium is not complete because the acidity difference between guanidinium and water is not large. The approximate pK_{a} values: 13.6 vs 15.7.

Complete deprotonation should be done with extremely strong bases, such as lithium diisopropylamide.

C(NH_{2})^{+}_{3}Cl^{−} + Li^{+}N(C_{3}H_{7})^{−}_{2} → HNC(NH_{2})_{2} + HN(C_{3}H_{7})_{2} + LiCl

== Use in protein denaturation ==
Guanidinium chloride is a strong chaotrope and one of the strongest denaturants used in physiochemical studies of protein folding. It also has the ability to decrease enzyme activity and increase the solubility of hydrophobic molecules. At high concentrations of guanidinium chloride (e.g., 6 M), proteins lose their ordered structure, and they tend to become randomly coiled, i.e. they do not contain any residual structure. However, at concentrations in the millimolar range in vivo, guanidinium chloride has been shown to "cure" prion positive yeast cells (i.e. cells exhibiting a prion positive phenotype revert to a prion negative phenotype). This is the result of inhibition of the Hsp104 chaperone protein known to play an important role in prion fiber fragmentation and propagation.

== Historical survey ==
Petrunkin and Petrunkin (1927, 1928) appear to be the first who studied the binding of GnHCl to gelatin and a mixture of thermally denatured protein from brain extract. Greenstein (1938, 1939), however, appears to be the first to discover the high denaturing action of guanidinium halides and thiocyanates in following the liberation of sulfhydryl groups in ovalbumin and other proteins as a function of salt concentration.

== Medical uses ==
Guanidine hydrochloride is indicated for the reduction of the symptoms of muscle weakness and easy fatigability associated with Lambert-Eaton myasthenic syndrome. It is not indicated for treating myasthenia gravis. It apparently acts by enhancing the release of acetylcholine following a nerve impulse. It also appears to slow the rates of depolarization and repolarization of muscle cell membranes. Initial dosage is usually between 10 and 15 mg/kg (5 to 7 mg/pound) of body weight per day in 3 or 4 divided doses. This dosage may be gradually increased to a total daily dosage of 35 mg/kg (16 mg/pound) of body weight per day or up to the development of side effects. Side effects may include increased peristalsis, diarrhea, paresthesia (tingling and numbness), and nausea. Fatal bone-marrow suppression, apparently dose related, can occur with guanidine.
