= Chaotropic agent =

Molecules that disrupt hydrogen bonding

A chaotropic agent is a molecule in water solution that can disrupt the hydrogen bonding network between water molecules (i.e. exerts chaotropic activity). This has an effect on the stability of the native state of other molecules in the solution, mainly macromolecules (proteins, nucleic acids) by weakening the hydrophobic effect. For example, a chaotropic agent reduces the amount of order in the structure of a protein formed by water molecules, both in the bulk and the hydration shells around hydrophobic amino acids, and may cause its denaturation.

Conversely, an antichaotropic agent (kosmotropic) is a molecule in an aqueous solution that will increase the hydrophobic effects within the solution. Antichaotropic salts such as ammonium sulphate can be used to precipitate substances from the impure mixture. This is used in protein purification processes, to remove undesired proteins from solution.

== Overview ==
A chaotropic agent is a substance which disrupts the structure of, and denatures, macromolecules such as proteins and nucleic acids (e.g. DNA and RNA). Chaotropic solutes increase the entropy of the system by interfering with intermolecular interactions mediated by non-covalent forces such as hydrogen bonds, van der Waals forces, and hydrophobic effects. Macromolecular structure and function is dependent on the net effect of these forces (see protein folding), therefore it follows that an increase in chaotropic solutes in a biological system will denature macromolecules, reduce enzymatic activity and induce stress on a cell (i.e., a cell will have to synthesize stress protectants).

Tertiary protein folding is dependent on hydrophobic forces from amino acids throughout the sequence of the protein. Chaotropic solutes decrease the net hydrophobic effect of hydrophobic regions because of a disordering of water molecules adjacent to the protein. This solubilises the hydrophobic region in the solution, thereby denaturing the protein. This is also directly applicable to the hydrophobic region in lipid bilayers; if a critical concentration of a chaotropic solute is reached (in the hydrophobic region of the bilayer) then membrane integrity will be compromised, and the cell will lyse.

Chaotropic salts that dissociate in solution exert chaotropic effects via different mechanisms. Whereas chaotropic compounds such as ethanol interfere with non-covalent intramolecular forces as outlined above, salts can have chaotropic properties by shielding charges and preventing the stabilization of salt bridges. Hydrogen bonding is stronger in non-polar media, so salts, which increase the chemical polarity of the solvent, can also destabilize hydrogen bonding. Mechanistically this is because there are insufficient water molecules to effectively solvate the ions. This can result in ion-dipole interactions between the salts and hydrogen bonding species which are more favorable than normal hydrogen bonds.

Common chaotropic agents include n-butanol, ethanol, guanidinium chloride, lithium perchlorate, lithium acetate, magnesium chloride, phenol, 2-propanol, sodium dodecyl sulfate, thiourea, and urea.

== See also ==
- Boom method
- Chaotropic activity
- Denaturation (biochemistry)
- DNA separation by silica adsorption
- Hofmeister series
- Kosmotropic
- Minicolumn purification
