= Food packaging sealing techniques =

Food packaging sealing techniques are joining processes that involve the permanent attachment of two or more surfaces of polymeric materials using a controlled application of a thermal, mechanical, or electromagnetic radiation source to cause the melting of the thermoplastic material, with or without the application of pressure, to achieve a hermetic, mechanically stable closure suitable for food preservation and protection. The sealing process is generally applied to the primary packaging in direct contact with food, which are usually flexible or semi-rigid packaging. A proper sealing is needed to guarantee the asepticity of the product inside the packaging, maintaining also the organoleptic properties of the product inside. Several methods are employed depending on the type of product to be protected, the material’s compatibility, and the desired shelf life.

== Food contact materials ==
Multilayer packaging configuration, PET as inner layer in contact with food.

Food packaging materials must be safe for food contact without endangering the consumer's health. All materials that are meant to come into contact with food must be compliant with Regulation (EC) No. 1935/2004. Usually, food packaging industry employs plastics as the inner layer in contact with food and are regulated by Regulation (EU) No. 10/2011, in which are specified requirements for plastic materials meant to come into contact with food. Specifically, plastics as polyethylene (PE), polypropylene (PP), and polyethylene terephthalate (PET) are considered safe and are regularly used in the food industry as a layer in direct contact with food. This is also where the sealing takes place, guaranteeing a hermetic closure and maintaining the hygienic safety of the packaged product. Even in the case of more complex multilayer materials like aluminum or paperboard multilayer packaging (as Tetra Brik Aseptic), the inner layer is made by plastic to guarantee the food contact compliancy and the sealability of the material.

== Sealing techniques ==
The sealing technique is selected depending on the food packaging configuration, to guarantee the possibility to heat the inner layer of the packaging material, and perform the sealing in the best possible way, allowing the packaging hermetic closure.

=== Heat sealing ===
Heat sealing is the most employed method for multilayer and plastic bag's closure in food industry. Depending on the architecture of the machine employed for the sealing process, the heat can be generated from heat plate or bar (conductive), inductor, hot air nozzle, or ultrasound excitation. During the heating phase, pressure is applied to allow a homogeneous adhesion of the inner layers.

==== Conductive heat sealing ====
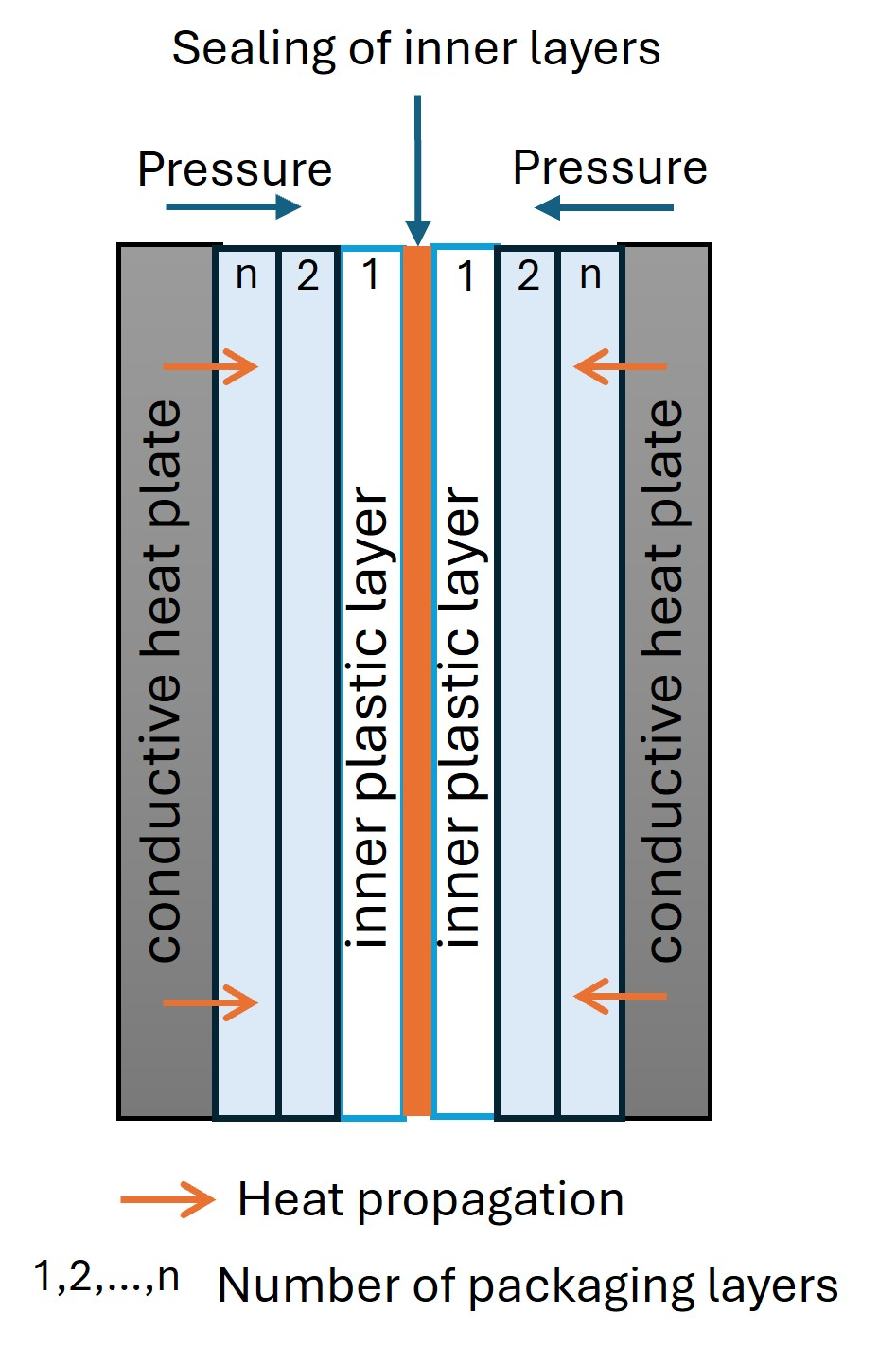
Schematic representation of conductive heat sealing in food packaging

In conductive heat sealing, the heat is usually generated from a heat-sealing plate or bar in direct contact with the external layer of the packaging. The heat is transferred through the different layers in according to the Fourier’s law, and can be reported as follows:

$\dot{Q}=\sum_{i=1}^{n}\frac{\kappa_i}{t_i}{A} {\Delta T}$

Where:

- $\dot{Q}$ is the thermal conduction
- $\kappa_i$ is the thermal conductivity of the specific layer of the packaging material
- $A$ is the packaging surface in contact with the conductive plate (exchange surface)
- $\Delta T$ is the difference in temperature from external and inner layer
- $t_i$ is the thickness of the different layers of the packaging material

Conductive heat can be applied to single or multilayer packaging configurations, taking into account that the thicker the packaging material, the higher the energy required to reaching the melting temperature of the inner layer, and guarantying a proper sealing. For this reason, conductive heat sealing is mostly employed in thin packaging configuration, as plastic or metalized pouch.

==== Induction heat sealing ====
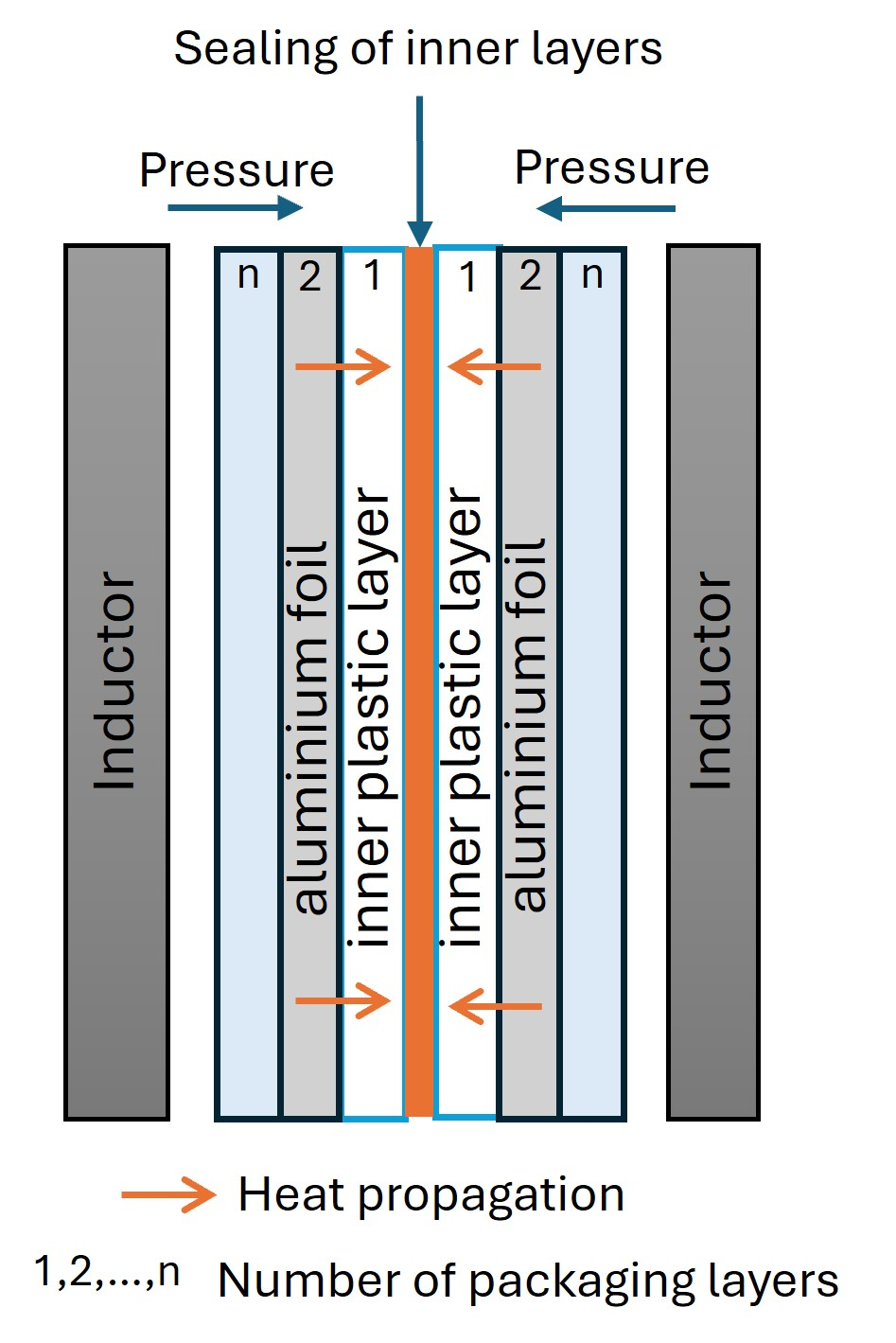
Schematic representation of Induction heat sealing in food packaging

Induction heat sealing is based on electromagnetic induction (Faraday's law), in which the heat is generated from the electrically conductive material. Because of its multilayer nature, many packagings such as cardboard/laminated multilayer packaging, have an induction-capable layer, which is usually an aluminum foil. This technique gives a higher energy efficiency compared to the conductive heat sealing, where the energy is localized on the external layer of the packaging. The process can be easily integrated into automated packaging lines, allowing for high repeatability and reliability in large-scale production. However, induction heat sealing requires the presence of a conductive layer (such as aluminum foil), which can be a limitation in cases where recycling or environmental compatibility require the use of all-plastic or compostable materials.

This kind of sealing, often referred to as cap sealing, is also frequently used to seal the lids of rigid containers.

==== Hot air heat sealing ====
Hot air heat sealing uses hot air nozzles that blow hot air into the sealing region, producing a seal. The sealing is made in two steps: the two inner layers of plastic is heated for a specific amount of time (generally from 0.3 to 1.5 seconds), and subsequently, the package is transferred to pressing plate to be pressed together, in this case heat will be provided by convection. Because the hot air blowing can be precisely controlled to target a specific area, this technology is particularly well-suited for sealing heat-sensitive or irregularly shaped packages. This reduces the possibility of injuring the external layers of the packing. Furthermore, because of no direct contact during heating, components wear out less and maintenance is easier, providing flexibility in packaging production line. Hot air heat sealing, however, can be less energy-efficient than other sealing techniques like induction or ultrasonic sealing, and it might require for more accurate air control systems to guarantee effective sealing, particularly at high production speeds.

==== Ultrasonic heat sealing ====
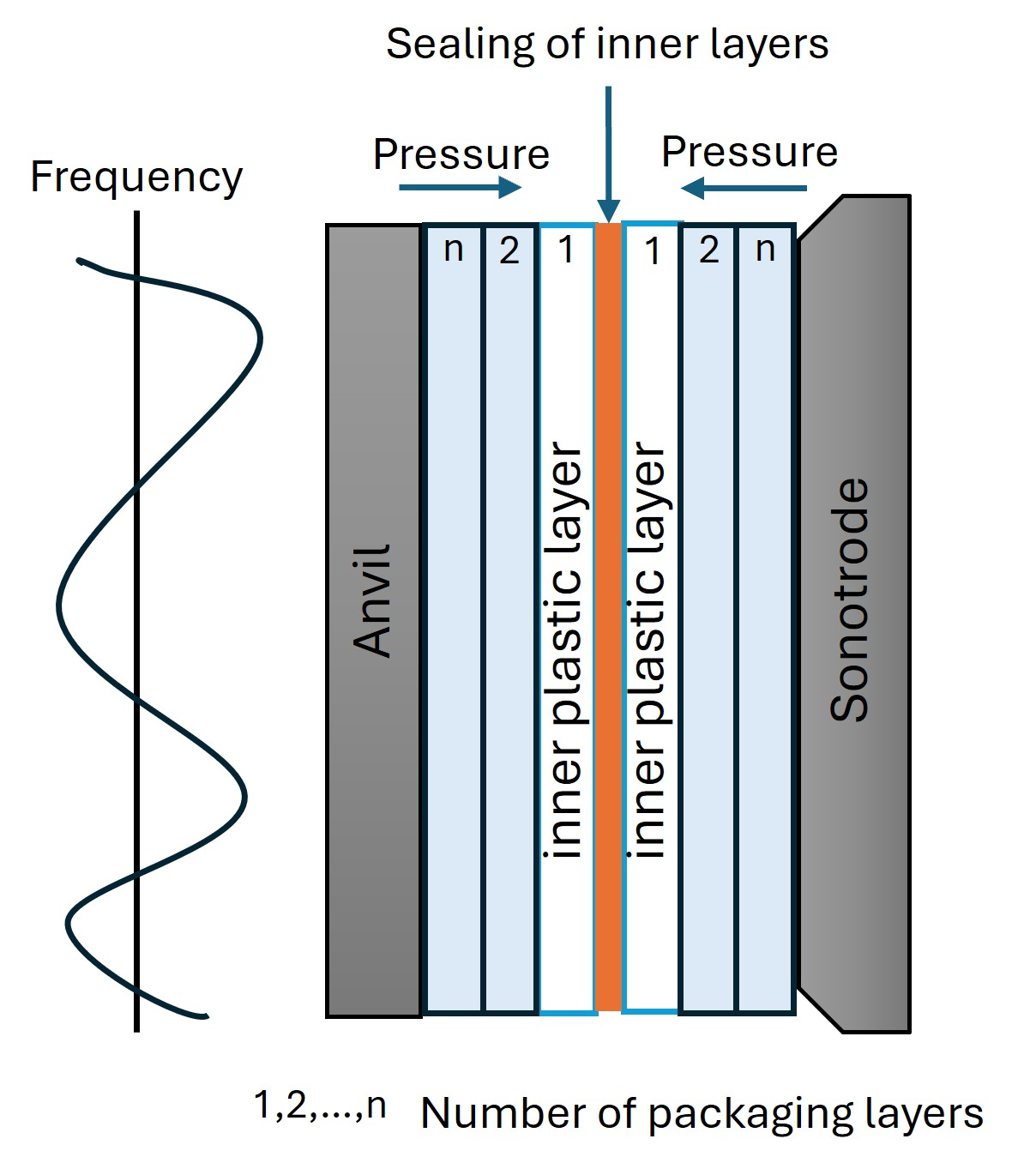
Schematic representation of ultrasonic sealing in food packaging

Ultrasonic sealing is a particular type of sealing because, in contrast to other sealing techniques, it creates a seal by combining pressure and vibration. Using piezo-electric (or piezo-magnetic) components, an ultrasonic sealing machine transforms low frequency electric energy from the generator into high frequency mechanical energy to produce seals. Prior to being sent to the sonotrode or ultrasonic horn, the mechanical energy is amplified in the converter and booster. Vibrations must be converted between an anvil and the horn in order to create the seal because pressure and vibration combine to melt the polymers between the materials and press them up against surfaces for adhesion. To focus the vibration on the intended sealing region, energy directors of various shapes are employed, causing the temperature in the area of interest to cause the sealant material to melt.

=== Laser sealing ===
Laser sealing consists in localized heating at the interface between two materials that are intended to be sealed; one of them needs to be absorbent to infrared radiation, and the other optically transparent to the laser beam. To enhance the sealing formation, infrared absorbing materials are usually added between the two materials to be sealed. Since heating is limited to a relatively tiny area inside the materials interface, heat-sensitive products like chocolate will not experience issues due to heat exposure. Because the process is contactless and highly controllable, it can be easily automated in high-speed production lines.

=== Cold sealing ===
Cold sealing technique is frequently used to seal package used for heat-sensitive commodities, such as chocolate, since heat can damage or otherwise degrade the packaged goods. Coatings are a crucial component of cold sealing because they provide the cohesiveness required for sealing and function as the adhesives in this process. Because it requires pre-applied adhesive coatings on inner food packaging layers, cold seals are not very frequently employed in packing industry, it also provides weak bond strengths compared with heat or laser sealing.

== Seal integrity assessment in food packaging ==
The hermetic closure of the package must be verified after the sealing process. To guarantee product safety, shelf life, and to be compliant with quality requirements and preserve organoleptic properties of the product inside, the integrity of the seal must be assessed through specific international standard methods.

The most widely employed standard methods to assess food packaging integrity in food industry are listed below:

- ASTM F88/88M-21: Standard Test Method for Seal Strength of Flexible Barrier Materials

In addition to evaluating the maximum seal holding force at the opening, the method also assesses the homogeneity of the seal and, where necessary, the average opening force.

- ASTM F2096-11: Standard Test Method for Detecting Gross Leaks in Packaging by Internal Pressurization (Bubble Test)

Qualitative method used to find large packaging leaks. The package is immersed in water and has air pressure inside; bubbles denote a leak being present.

- ASTM F2095-07: Standard Test Methods for Pressure Decay Test for Flexible Packages With and Without Restraining Plates in Packaging by Internal Pressurization

This method involves the detection of small leaks, using a pressure difference. The package is pressurized, evaluating the pressure loss as a function of time, highlighting potential leaks more sensitively than bubble test.

- ASTM F2338-09: American Society for Testing and Materials. Standard Test Method for Nondestructive Detection of Leaks in Packages by Vacuum Decay Method

Similar to ASTM F2095-07, the method evaluates the pressure loss as a function of time, however the seal rupture pressure is not reached, evaluating the sealing with a nondestructive approach.

- ASTM F3039-15: Standard Test Method for Detecting Leaks in Nonporous Packaging or Flexible Barrier Materials by Dye Penetration

The procedure involves applying a dye within the sealing area. Leaks can be found and their locations determined through a visual assessment of the infiltration of the dye.
