= Ultrasonic atomization =

Process in a liquid on a vibrating surface

Ultrasonic atomization is a process in which a liquid, in contact with a surface vibrating at ultrasonic frequencies, forms standing capillary waves that lead to the ejection of fine droplets. As the amplitude of these waves increases, the wave crests can reach a critical height where the cohesive forces of the liquid are overcome by the surface tension, leading to the ejection of small droplets from the wave tips.

== Mechanism and principles ==
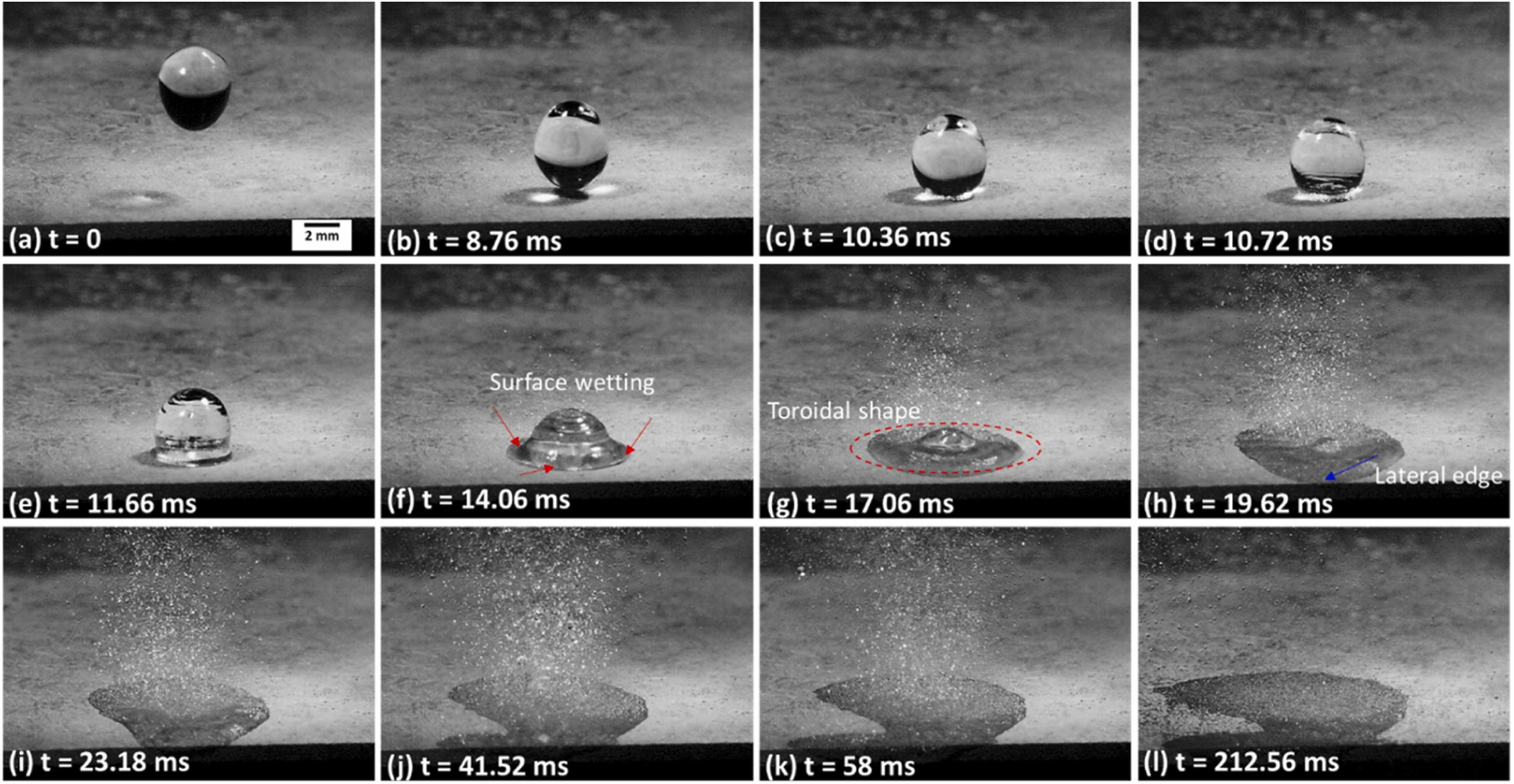
Ultrasonic atomization

The formation of droplets during ultrasonic atomization remains complex and not fully understood, though several theories attempt to explain it. One leading theory, the capillary wave hypothesis by Lang, suggests that droplets form at the peaks of capillary waves on the liquid surface. Lang developed a formula that relates droplet size to capillary wavelength. The average diameter estimation was obtained using a constant that was later adjusted by Yasuda to better predict smaller droplet sizes in the micrometer range. This prediction aligns well with observations from laser diffraction, though other methods have detected finer droplets that Lang's model does not account for. An alternative theory, proposed by Sollner, is the cavitation hypothesis. This theory links droplet formation to cavitation—when bubbles in the liquid rapidly form and collapse, creating shockwaves that break apart the liquid surface into droplets. Sollner's findings suggest cavitation is essential for dispersing liquids and shares similarities with emulsion formation. A combined theory was later proposed by Bograslavski and Eknadiosyants, suggesting that both mechanisms work together: shockwaves from cavitation enhance the breaking of capillary wave crests, leading to droplet formation. However, this combined theory faces some scepticism, as cavitation requires high power at MHz frequencies, which some researchers argue may be too high to support this mechanism effectively in practice.

== History ==
The phenomenon of ultrasonic atomization was first reported by Wood and Loomis in 1927. They observed that a fine mist was produced from the liquid surface when a liquid layer was subjected to high-frequency sound waves. Wood and Loomis's work hinted at a variety of applications for ultrasonics, many of which became realities in later decades, with the development in the scope of ultrasound generation (piezoelectricity), transfer (sonotrode materials), and control (horn analyzers).

=== Atomization of aqueous solutions ===
First commercial application of ultrasonic atomization effect was nebulizers. Ultrasonic nebulizers made their first appearance in 1949, initially designed as humidifiers. Medical professionals quickly recognized their potential for delivering therapeutic aerosols suitable for inhalation, leading to the incorporation of medications into the nebulization process. Ultrasonic nebulizers have been utilized for various respiratory diseases, including asthma and cystic fibrosis. Their ability to deliver medications directly to the lungs has made them a valuable tool in managing these conditions.

=== Aqueous solutions containing metal derivatives ===
In the late 20th century, scientists exploring nanoparticle synthesis via spray pyrolysis began to see ultrasonic atomization as a promising technique for precursor droplet formation such as noble metal based salts solutions. Known as ultrasonic spray pyrolysis (USP), this technique allowed for finer control over particle size as it strongly depends on the frequency, making it particularly suited for nanomaterials used in electronic devices, solar cells, and batteries. By the 1980s and 1990s, ultrasonic atomization was gaining ground as researchers demonstrated its utility in producing complex oxides and other materials essential for energy storage like lithium-ion batteries. By the early 2000s, this method was integral to industries seeking uniform coatings and nanoparticle films, demonstrating the impact of ultrasonic atomization on industrial manufacturing.

=== Liquid metals ===
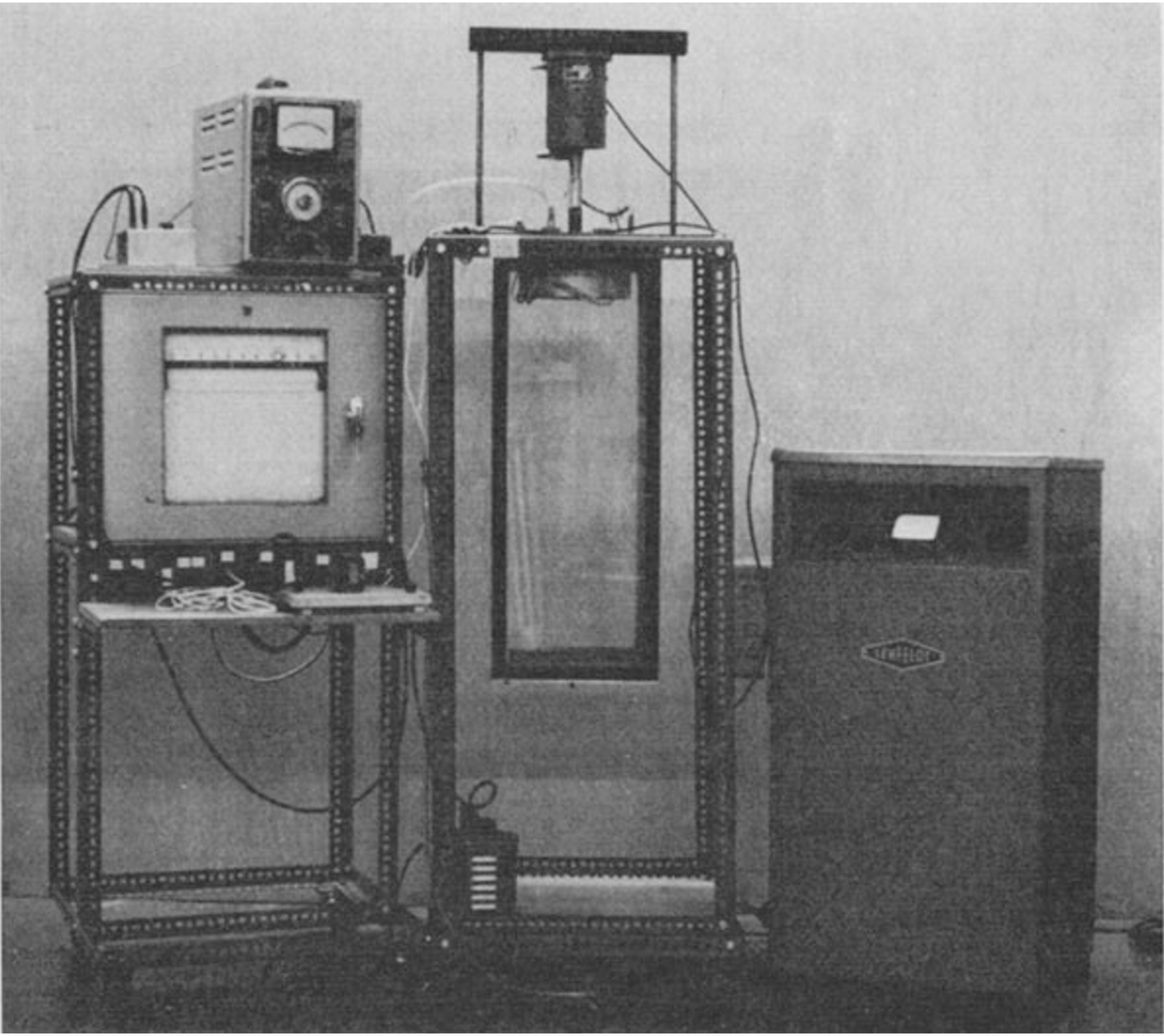
First-reported metal ultrasonic atomizer

In 1965, Pohlman and Stamm published a book, which marked a contribution to the field of ultrasonic atomization by identifying and describing the parameters influencing the process such as viscosity, capillary wavelength, surface tension and amplitude. One of the key chapters in the book, titled "5.1 Vernebelung geschmolzener Metalle," detailed the first experiments on the high temperature ultrasonic atomization in which molten metals were used. They discussed its potential technical applications as well as limitations stating that the transition from successful laboratory experiments to a usable technical plant has not yet been found due to issues with conciliation wettability and sonotrode durability. They were able to atomize lead at 350 °C and showcased the damage to the sonotrode induced by cavitation. In 1967, Lierke and Grießhammer published their work in which they were able to ultrasonically atomize metal with melting points up to 700 °C.

Later developments of Lierke focused on making high-temperature ultrasonic atomization of metals more practical by stabilizing melt delivery and protecting the transducer from the hot zone. A patent granted in the early 1980s described feeding the liquid into velocity-nodal regions of a bending resonator to maintain an atomizable film, and proposed heating the vibrating resonator (including by induction) together with intermediate cooling sections to shield temperature-sensitive parts of the excitation system.

In the early 2000s, Caccioppoli et al. reported a metal atomiser in which an alloy is induction-melted under argon and the melt is disrupted in a tubular ultrasonic resonator operated under an inert atmosphere; drawing on transducer concepts developed by Prokic, they described using load-tolerant "hammer"-type ultrasonic transducers designed to be less sensitive to changes in acoustic load than conventional bolt-clamped (Langevin type) designs, improving stability under fluctuating melt conditions. Combined with multifrequency excitation and acoustic-activity sensing, the drive frequency can be swept around resonance, shifting vibration anti-nodes along the resonator, widening the effective atomization zone, and reducing the sensitivity of droplet size to melt flow rate. Variants in which material is melted locally using highly focused energy source reducing the hot zone have been explored where an external heat source primarily generates the melt (e.g., a continuous-wave CO₂ laser producing a melt pool on a consumable substrate) while ultrasonic vibration assists melt ejection and breakup into droplets.

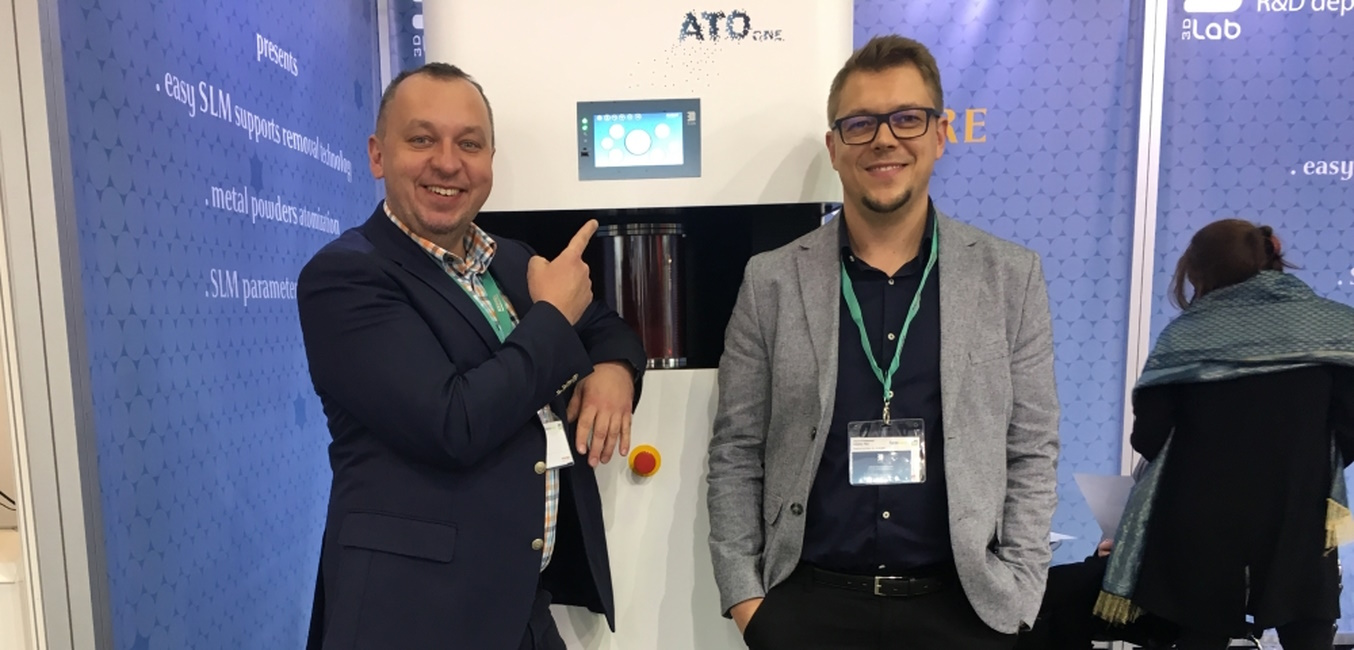
ATO One laboratory-scale ultrasonic metal atomizer, publicly demonstrated in 2017

Ultrasonic atomization of metals had been described in scientific literature since the 1960s. A later manufacturer overview noted that practical implementations had often been limited to alloys with relatively low melting points, in part because of sonotrode durability at elevated temperatures.. In 2017, the Polish company 3D Lab sp. z o.o. (Warsaw) filed a patent application with the Polish Patent Office for a device for manufacturing spherical metal powders by ultrasonic atomization, naming Żrodowski, Rałowicz, Rozpendowski and Czarnecka as inventors and publicly demonstrated the ATO One prototype the same year.

A related patent describes an ultrasonic metal atomizer that separates the hot melting zone from the ultrasonic stack. The specification describes a water-cooled, non-consumable sonotrode made from a material with thermal conductivity exceeding 150 W/m·K, acting as a heat sink and terminating in a replaceable consumable tip made from a material with a melting or decomposition temperature of at least 1200 °C. The components may be joined by diffusion bonding or mechanical interference fitting. The tip is heated by an external source, while the sonotrode transmits ultrasonic vibration to promote droplet ejection. According to the patent specification, the arrangement is intended to improve heat transfer, protect the ultrasonic stack from elevated processing temperatures and extend sonotrode service life. Like the earlier protected-resonator arrangements discussed above, it separates the temperature-sensitive ultrasonic components from the principal hot zone and uses a replaceable melt-contacting element.

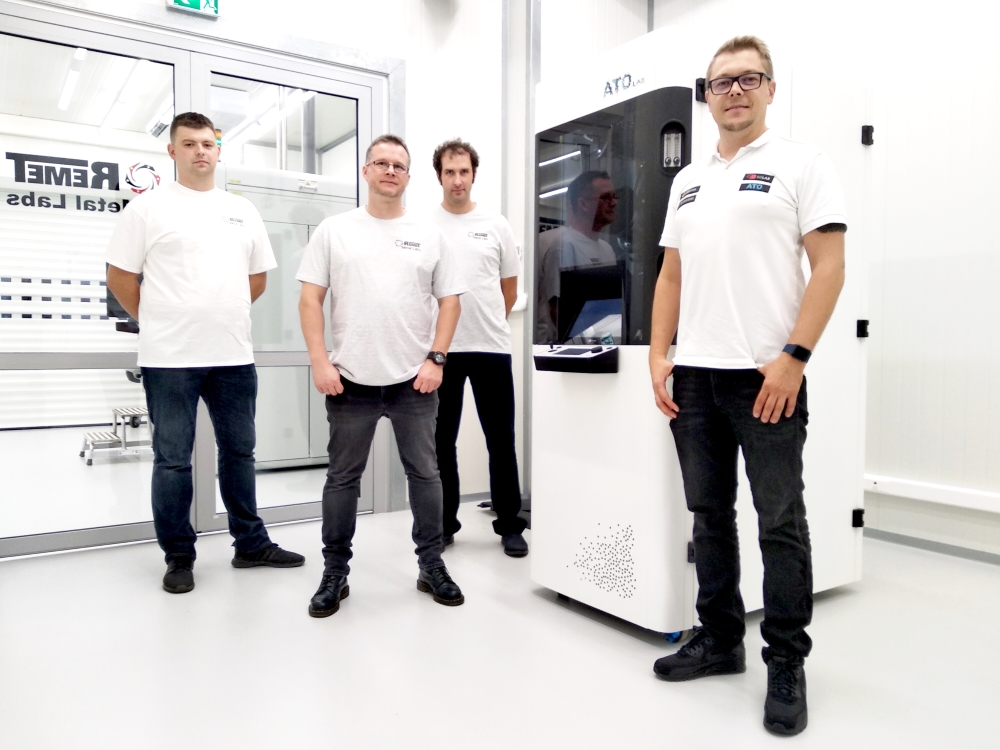
ATO Lab installed at REMET S.A. metal 3D printing lab in 2019

In 2018, 3D Lab presented the finalized ATO Lab system. The trade press described it as a compact, lab‑scale device intended for research on new alloys; a later industry overview also discussed its commercial introduction. In 2019, 3D Lab completed the first commercial installation of its ATO Lab ultrasonic metal atomizer at the REMET Metal Labs facility in Stalowa Wola. The installation was part of a broader initiative to establish an advanced additive manufacturing laboratory integrating metal powder production and 3D printing technologies.The integration of the ATO Lab with metal additive manufacturing equipment was reported to enable in-house powder production and testing of new alloys and process parameters. A further contemporary report described the installation as part of the development of compact, laboratory-scale atomization equipment for additive manufacturing research. Also in 2019, ultrasonic atomization using the system was extended to precious-metal applications.

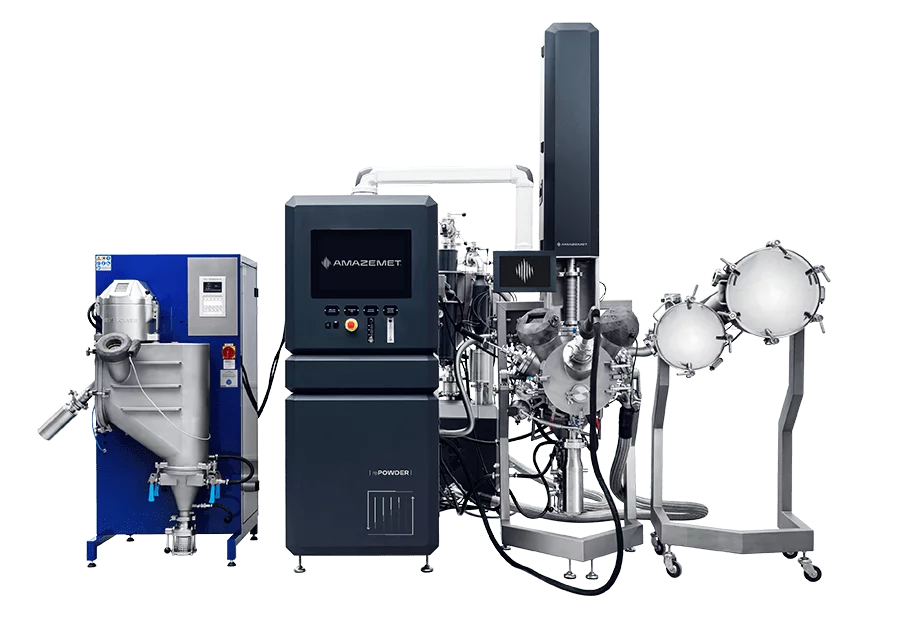
rePOWDER metal ultrasonic atomizer

Separately, in 2019, researchers involved in earlier work on ultrasonic atomization founded the spin-off company AMAZEMET under Warsaw University of Technology. Subsequent company work included cold-crucible melting routes and other variants, including induction-based approaches. In 2021, AMAZEMET delivered its first rePowder ultrasonic atomization platform to the Swiss Federal Laboratories for Materials Science and Technology (Empa) for research and development.

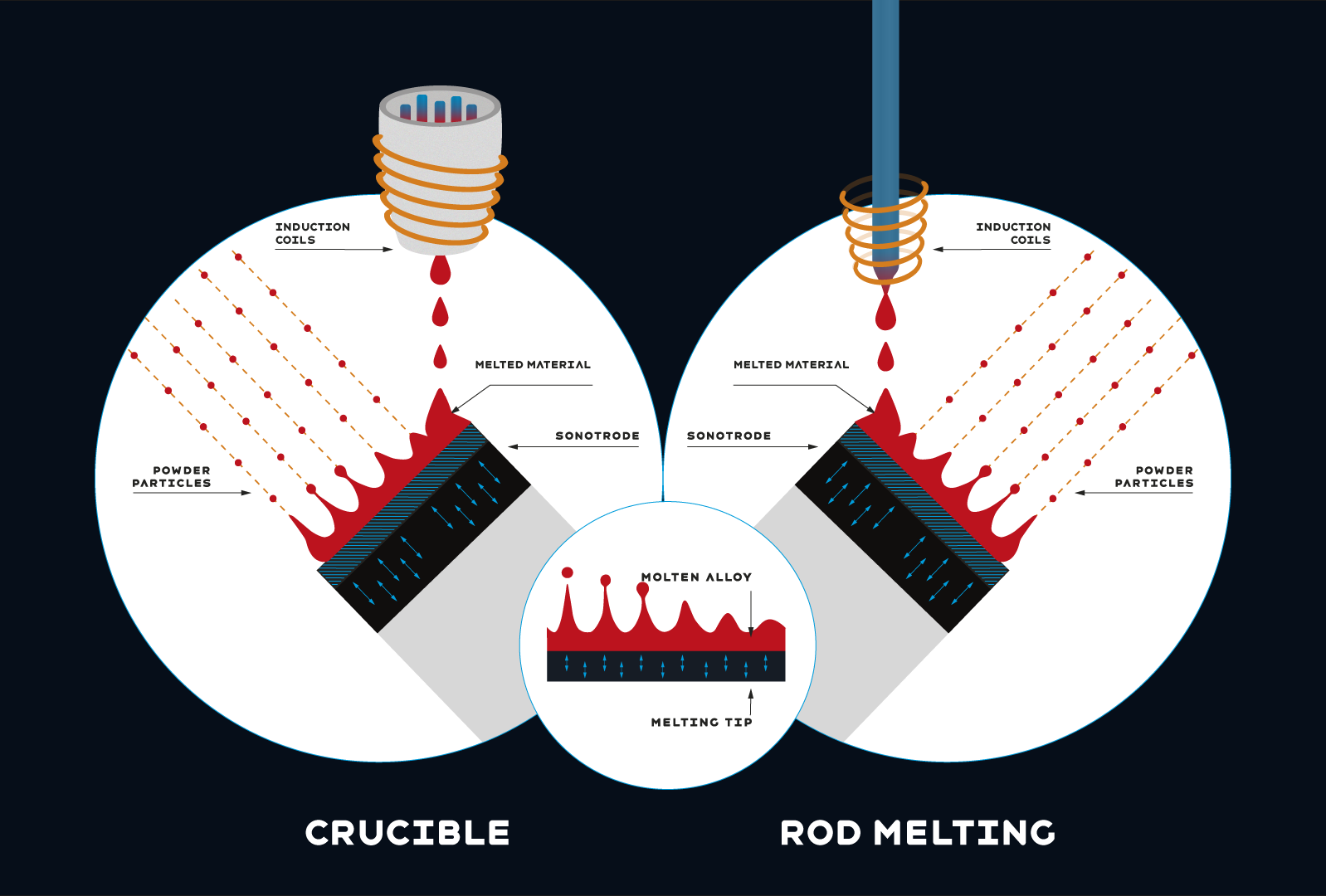
ATO IMS feeding options for induction melting and melt delivery

In 2023, 3D Lab introduced an induction-melting arrangement for ultrasonic atomizers, using induction heating and supporting both crucible-based and rod-feed processing. Its working assembly incorporates separate induction coils for melting the feedstock and heating the atomization platform and is covered by Polish patent PL249223B1. A later study examined 7075 and Al–Zn–Mg–Cu–Co–Cr–Mo powders produced using this induction-based ultrasonic atomization route. Related ultrasonic-atomization patents have also been granted in multiple jurisdictions, including Poland, the United States, China, Japan, South Korea and India.

In 2024, a study led by Dmitry Eskin and Iakovos Tzanakis reported new insights into the mechanism of ultrasonic atomization, finding that cavitation plays a critical role in the process and directly observing it using high-speed imaging. The sonotrode used in the experiments was made of a high-temperature-resistant carbon-fibre plate to atomize pure aluminium melted at 800 °C. Published studies have reported ultrasonic atomization or the subsequent processing of ultrasonically atomized powders involving austenitic stainless steel, a Mo–Si–Ti alloy, niobium alloy, magnesium alloy, zirconium alloy, titanium alloy, and a high-entropy alloy. The technique's ability to produce small batches without a minimum charge, combined with its compact equipment footprint, has made it a practical option for R&D-scale production of specialty alloy powders for additive manufacturing.

The progression of ultrasonic atomization from early physical observations to reliable processing of molten metals required the resolution of several engineering challenges that are not fully captured by theoretical models alone. Many of the technical solutions that enabled the transition of ultrasonic atomization from laboratory-scale experiments to practical and high-temperature metal processing have been disclosed in patent literature. These documents address key challenges such as ultrasonic stack design, melt-sonotrode interaction, thermal management, resonance stability under variable load, and the integration of external heat sources. A selection of representative patents and technical disclosures relevant to the development of ultrasonic atomization is summarized below.

== See also ==
- Mist
- Ultrasound
- Piezoelectricity
- Metal powder
- Induction plasma
