= Aluminium-based nanogalvanic alloys =

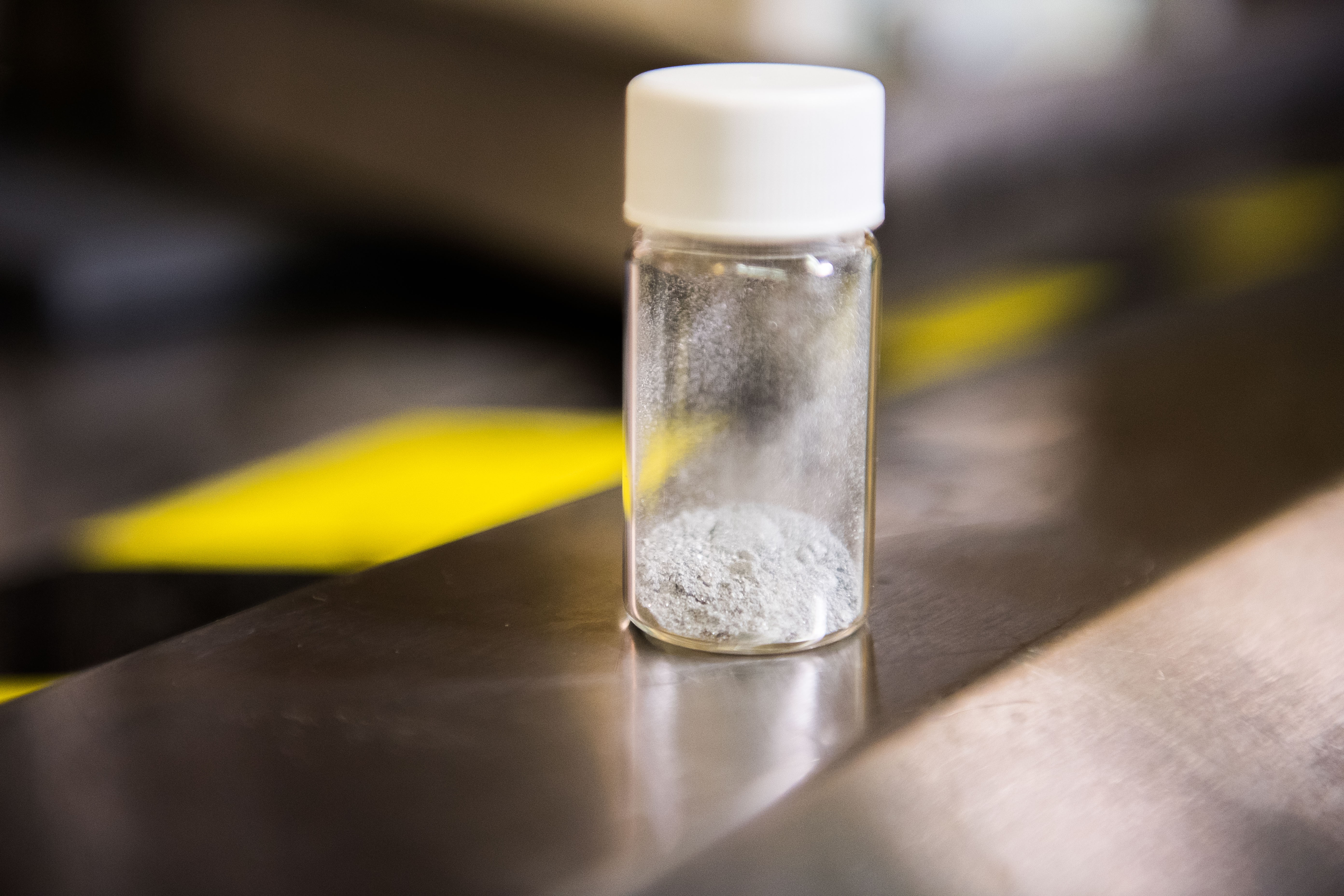
Nano-galvanic aluminum-based powder developed by the U.S. Army Research Laboratory

Aluminium-based nanogalvanic alloys refer to a class of nanostructured metal powders that spontaneously and rapidly produce hydrogen gas upon contact with water or any liquid containing water as a result of their galvanic metal microstructure. It serves as a method of hydrogen production that can take place at a rapid pace at room temperature without the assistance of chemicals, catalysts, or externally supplied power.

== Properties ==
Aluminium-based nanogalvanic alloys are characterized by their galvanic microstructure, which comprises an anodic matrix consisting of aluminum, an aluminum alloy, and a cathodic dispersed phase of another metal composition. These other metals may be tin, magnesium, silicon, bismuth, lead, gallium, indium, zinc, carbon, or a mixture of these metals. These alloys produce hydrogen gas when the cathodic disperse phase forms galvanic couples with the anodic matrix and the resulting galvanic metal microstructure comes in contact with water or any liquid containing water. The nanostructured galvanic couple, with aluminium as the anode and the other metal element as the cathode, rapidly disturbs the formation of the native oxide layer and continually exposes fresh aluminium surfaces to hydrolysis.

The size of the particles that make up the cathodic disperse phase can range from less than 50 nanometers in length to less than 1000 nanometers in length. No additional health hazards have been observed with the handling of the nanogalvanic powders. The by-products of the powder reaction with water was also found to be non-toxic. In terms of performance, the aluminium-based nanogalvanic alloys were demonstrated to produce 1000 ml. of hydrogen gas per gram of aluminium in less than 1 minute and 1340 ml—100% of the theoretical yield at 295 K and 1 atm.—in 3 minutes without the need for hazardous or costly materials, or additional processes. Aluminium-based nanogalvanic alloys can be manufactured by means of low energy ball milling at room temperature or at lower temperatures and remain stable at standard temperature, pressure, and humidity levels.

In 2017, ARL researchers discovered that the hydrogen generation rate increases by almost two-fold when the aluminium-based nanogalvanic alloy powder comes in contact with urine, when compared with pure water.

== History ==
Aluminium-based nanogalvanic alloys were discovered by researchers of the Metals Branch of ARL's Weapons and Materials Research Directorate (WMRD) of the U.S. Army Research Laboratory (ARL) in the early 2010s during testing of a new nanostructured aluminium alloy intended for structural materials applications. During metallographic polishing for microhardness experiments, they noticed that the aluminium was disappearing upon contact with water and soon realized that it was creating hydrogen gas in the process. The alloy powder was later repurposed for energy applications. A patent was filed for the invention in June 2018 in order to license the aluminium powder to industry. In 2019, the hydrogen fuel company H2 Power, LLC was the first to receive an exclusive license to use the aluminium-based nanogalvanic alloys to investigate automotive and transportation power generation applications for cars, trucks, motorcycles, and other vehicles. As of 2019, ARL researchers are looking for ways to improve the production and manufacturing process of the aluminium-based nanogalvanic alloys.

== Overview ==
When aluminum makes contact with water, hydrogen gas is produced as a result of hydrolysis. However, at the same time, water oxidizes the aluminum and causes a thin protective layer of aluminum oxide to rapidly form on the surface of the metal, preventing further hydrolysis. In order for the aluminum to continuously produce hydrogen gas, scientists had to forcefully remove or at least fracture the aluminum oxide layer, typically dissolving it in water with the help of hazardous compounds such as hydrochloric acid, sodium hydroxide, or expensive elements such as gallium/indium. Other methods apply external energy in the form of an electric current or superheated steam to slowly force the reaction at elevated temperatures. The aluminum based nanogalvanic alloy, a particulate material invented by the U.S. Army Research Laboratory (ARL), is able to generate hydrogen by hydrolysis at room temperature with any liquid that contains water (e.g. naturally scavenged water, coffee, energy drinks, urine, etc.) without relying on any other chemicals, catalysts, or externally supplied power. The nanostructured galvanic couple, with aluminum as the anode and another element (e.g. tin, bismuth, etc.) as the cathode, rapidly disturbs the formation of the native oxide layer and thus continually exposes fresh aluminum surfaces to hydrolysis.

== Development ==
Aluminum based nanogalvanic alloys were initially discovered by researchers of the Metals Branch of ARL's Weapons and Materials Research Directorate (WMRD) while they were testing a new nanostructured aluminum alloy intended for structural materials applications. During metallographic polishing for microhardness experiments, they noticed that the aluminum was disappearing upon contact with water and soon realized that it was creating hydrogen gas in the process. The research team then decided to repurpose the alloy powder for energy applications. A patent was filed for the invention in June 2018 in order to license the aluminum powder to industry. In 2019, the hydrogen fuel company H2 Power, LLC was the first to receive an exclusive license to use the aluminum based nanogalvanic alloys to investigate automotive and transportation power generation applications for cars, trucks, motorcycles, and other vehicles. As of 2019, ARL researchers are looking for ways to improve the production and manufacturing process of the aluminum based nanogalvanic alloys.

== Properties ==
Aluminum based nanogalvanic alloys are characterized by the size of their galvanic microstructure and consist of particles with a mesh size of -325, which is equivalent to a diameter of around 50 microns. Since the grain size of the powders is in the nanometer scale and the particle size is tens of microns similar to conventional powders, no additional health hazards are associated with the handling of the nanogalvanic powders. The by-products of the powder reaction with water is non-toxic and occurs naturally. The aluminum based nanogalvanic alloys were also demonstrated to produce 1000 ml. of hydrogen gas per gram of aluminum in less than 1 minute and 1340 ml—100% of the theoretical yield at 295 K and 1 atm.—in 3 minutes without the need for hazardous or costly materials, or additional processes. These nanogalvanic structured powders can be manufactured by means of high energy ball milling at room temperature or at lower temperatures. The powders may be compacted in the form of tablets for ease of transportation, which would reduce reliance on high-pressure or liquid hydrogen cylinders traditionally used for shipment. Additionally, they are stable in the atmosphere at standard temperature, pressure, and humidity levels, allowing for convenient storage.

== Applications ==
One of the major potential applications of aluminum-based nanogalvanic alloys is hydrogen production for fuel cells. Due to their high energy efficiency, non-toxic nature, and transportation ease, the alloy powders have also been considered as an alternative energy source for batteries (when coupled with fuel cells) during reconnaissance for soldiers on the battlefield. Additionally, the alloy powder may also be 3D-printed into self-cannibalizing drone components that could recharge the drone's hydrogen supply by making contact with water whenever it runs low on power. ARL researchers also discovered that the hydrogen generation rate increases by almost two-fold when the aluminum based nanogalvanic alloy powder comes in contact with urine, when compared with pure water. Because of this unique property, scientists have considered applying the aluminum powder in austere environments where power and water are scarce, such as deserts or space, where urine could be repurposed as a fuel source.
