= Iron powder =

Metal dust

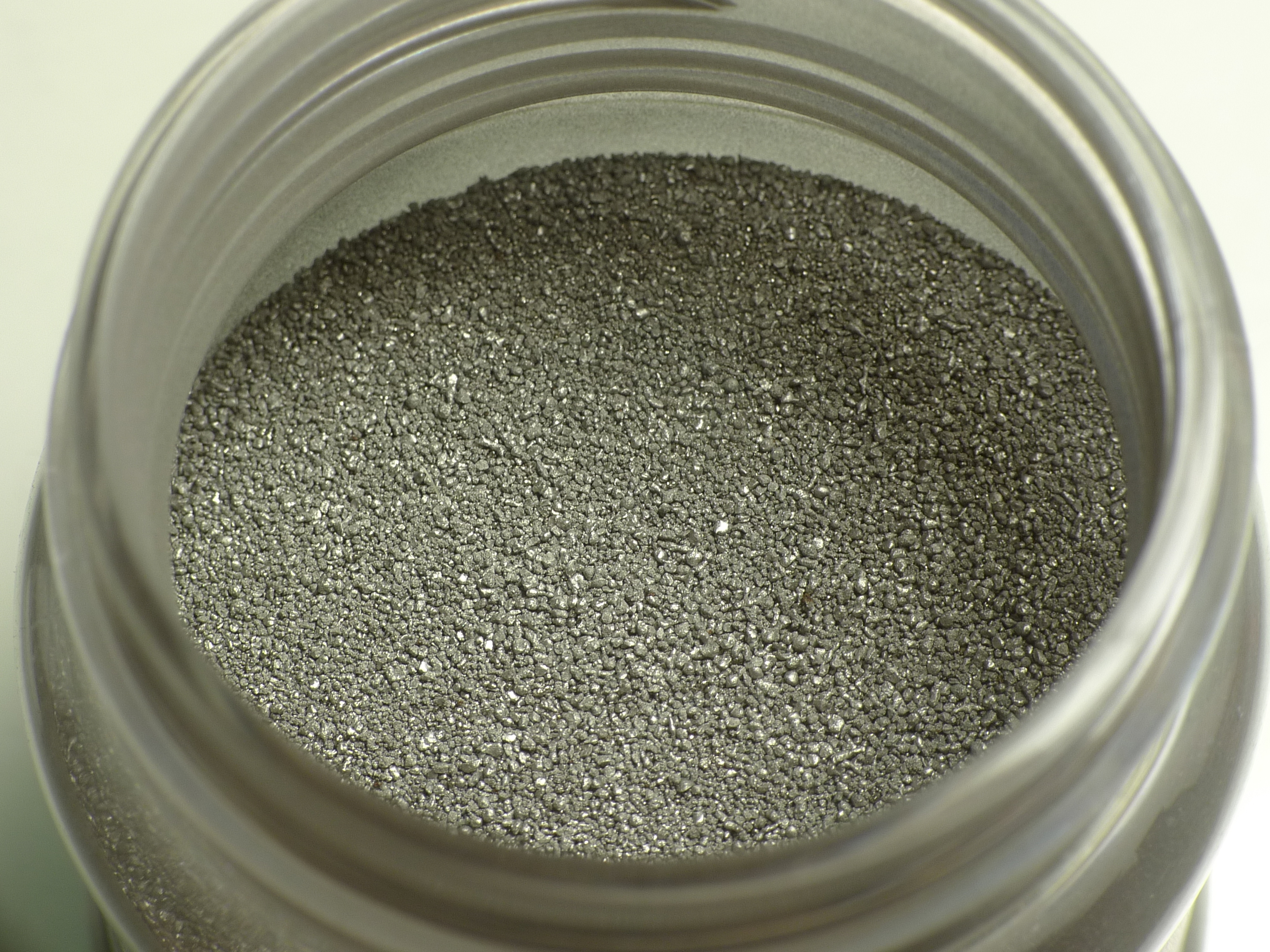
Iron powder

Iron powder has several uses; for example production of magnetic alloys and certain types of steels.

Iron powder is formed as a whole from several other iron particles. The particle sizes vary anywhere from 20-200 μm. The iron properties differ depending on the production method and history of a specific iron powder. There are three types of iron powder classifications: reduced iron powder, atomized powder, and electrolytic iron powder. Each type is used in various applications depending on their properties. There is very little difference in the visual appearances of reduced iron powder and atomized iron powder.

== Applications ==
=== Automobiles ===
Most iron powders are used for automobile parts.

==== Engine parts ====
- Cam shaft pulley
- Cam shaft sprocket
- Crank shaft pulley
- Crank shaft sprocket
- Cap crank bearing
- Valve guide
- Valve seat
- Rocker arm chip
- Oil pump inner rotor
- Oil pump outer rotor

==== Steering parts, suspension, and brake parts ====
- Power steering rotor cam ring
- Pressure plate
- Rack guide
- Shock absorber
- Ball joint
- ABS sensor

==== Seats and door parts ====
- Seat lifter cam set
- Door mirror plate clutch
- Striker
- Slider

==== Transmission parts ====
- M/T Synchronizer hub
- A/T Hub clutch
- Synchronizer ring
- Retaining plate
- Synchronizer key
- Pressure plate
- Shift fork
- Turbine hub
- Weight governor
- Cam stater T. C.
- Outer race

=== Additive manufacturing ===
Iron powders are increasingly used as feedstock in metal additive manufacturing processes. In binder jetting, fine iron powder is selectively bonded with a liquid binder and subsequently sintered to produce complex near-net-shape parts with properties comparable to conventional powder metallurgy components. Gas-atomized spherical iron alloy powders, including stainless steel grades such as 316L and 17-4 PH, are also widely employed in laser powder bed fusion for tooling, structural, and medical applications.

=== Other ===
Iron powder is also used for the following:

- Bearings and filter parts
- Machine parts
- Hand Warmers
- High strength/wear-resistant parts
- Magnetic materials
- Friction parts (mainly automobile parts)
- As a metal energy carrier
  - Wet cycle: storage of energy and generation of hydrogen using iron powders
  - Dry cycle: storage of energy, production of heat and electricity using iron powders
- Oxygen scavengers – can be in small pouches separate from food or directly added to food, in which case it also serves as food fortification

== See also ==
- Metal powder
- Thermite
