= Ultrasonic horn =

Ultrasonic device

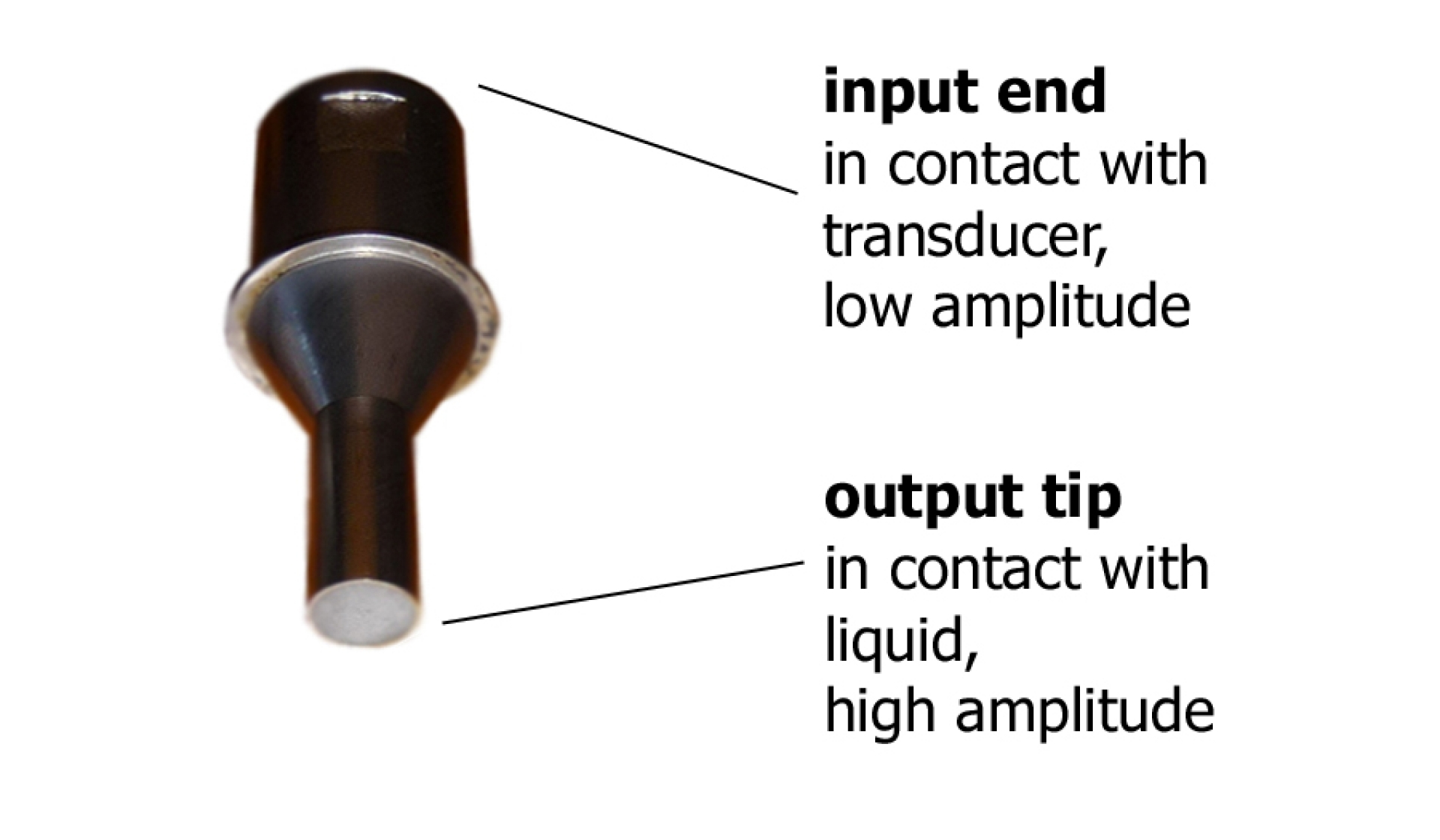
Conventional Converging Ultrasonic Horn, produced by Industrial Sonomechanics, LLC

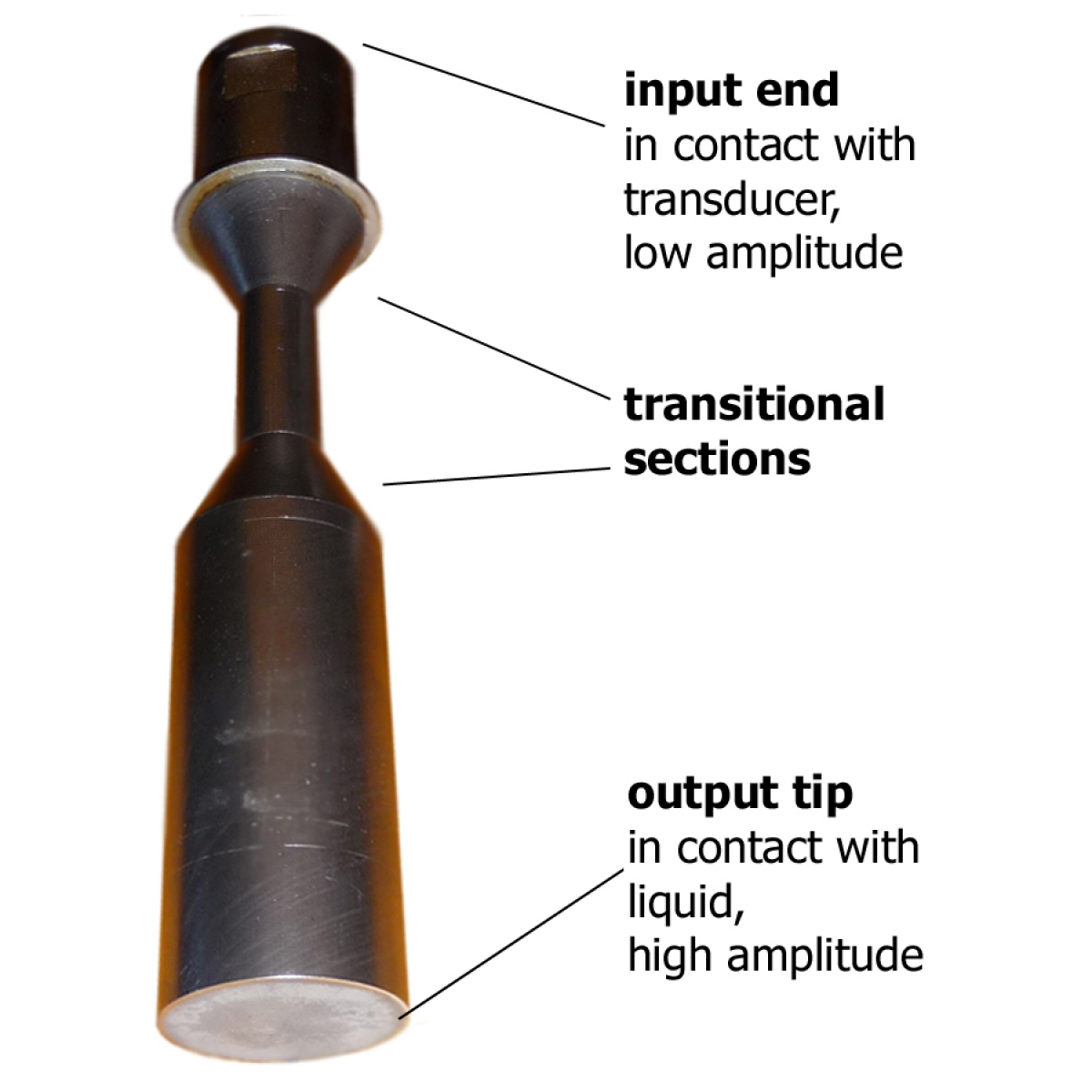
Full-wave Barbell Ultrasonic Horn, produced by Industrial Sonomechanics, LLC

An ultrasonic horn (also known as acoustic horn, sonotrode, acoustic waveguide, ultrasonic probe) is a tapering metal bar commonly used for augmenting the oscillation displacement amplitude provided by an ultrasonic transducer operating at the low end of the ultrasonic frequency spectrum (commonly between 15 and 100 kHz). The device is necessary because the amplitudes provided by the transducers themselves are insufficient for most practical applications of power ultrasound. Another function of the ultrasonic horn is to efficiently transfer the acoustic energy from the ultrasonic transducer into the treated media, which may be solid (for example, in ultrasonic welding, ultrasonic cutting or ultrasonic soldering) or liquid (for example, in ultrasonic homogenization, sonochemistry, milling, emulsification, spraying or cell disruption). Ultrasonic processing of liquids relies on intense shear forces and extreme local conditions (temperatures up to 5000 K and pressures up to 1000 atm) generated by acoustic cavitation.

== Description ==
The ultrasonic horn is commonly a solid metal rod with a round transverse cross-section and a variable-shape longitudinal cross-section - the rod horn. Another group includes the block horn, which has a large rectangular transverse cross-section and a variable-shape longitudinal cross-section, and more complex composite horns. The devices from this group are used with solid treated media. The length of the device must be such that there is mechanical resonance at the desired ultrasonic frequency of operation – one or multiple half wavelengths of ultrasound in the horn material, with sound speed dependence on the horn’s cross-section taken into account. In a common assembly, the ultrasonic horn is rigidly connected to the ultrasonic transducer using a threaded stud.

Ultrasonic horns may be classified by the following main features: 1) Longitudinal cross-section shape – stepped, exponential, conical, catenoidal, etc. 2) Transverse cross-section shape – round, rectangular, etc. 3) Number of elements with different longitudinal cross-section profile – common and composite. A composite ultrasonic horn has a transitional section with a certain longitudinal cross-section shape (non-cylindrical), positioned between cylindrical sections.

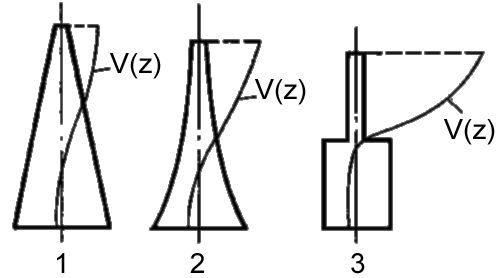
Longitudinal cross-sections of simple half-wavelength ultrasonic horns: 1 – conical, 2 – exponential or catenoidal, 3 - stepped. In all figures: V(z) and e(z) - distributions of amplitude and deformation

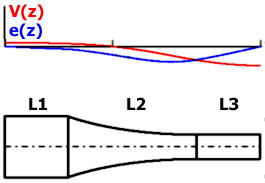
Longitudinal cross-section of a round composite converging half-wave ultrasonic horn, where L1, L3 – cylindrical sections, L2 – catenoidal transitional section

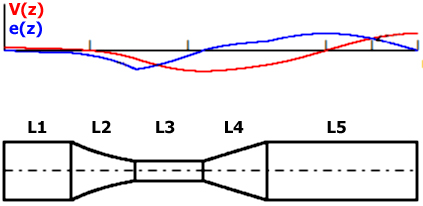
Longitudinal cross-section of a round full-wave Barbell horn, where L1, L3, L5 – cylindrical sections, L2 – exponential transitional section, L4 – conical transitional section

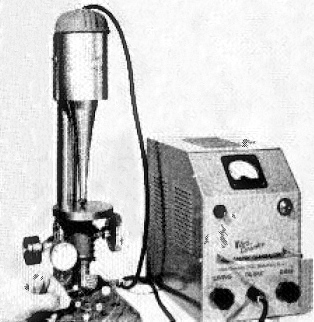
A horn in an ultrasonic drill from 1955. The horn, the long tapering steel rod at center, couples the ultrasonic transducer in the housing at top to the tool which presses against the workpiece on the worktable at bottom.

Frequently, an ultrasonic horn has a transitional section with a longitudinal cross-section profile that converges towards the output end. Thus, the horn’s longitudinal oscillation amplitude increases towards the output end, while the area of its transverse cross-section decreases. Ultrasonic horns of this type are used primarily as parts of various ultrasonic instruments for ultrasonic welding, ultrasonic soldering, cutting, making surgical tools, molten metal treatment, etc. Converging ultrasonic horns are also commonly included in laboratory liquid processors used for a variety of process studies, including sonochemical, emulsification, dispersing and many others.

In high-power industrial ultrasonic liquid processors, such as commercial sonochemical reactors, ultrasonic homogenizers and ultrasonic milling systems intended for the treatment of large volumes of liquids at high ultrasonic amplitudes (ultrasonic mixing, production of nanoemulsions, solid particle dispersing, ultrasonic nanocrystallization, etc.), the preferred ultrasonic horn type is the Barbell horn. Barbell horns are able to amplify ultrasonic amplitudes while retaining large output diameters and radiating areas. It is, therefore, possible to directly reproduce laboratory optimization studies in a commercial production environment by switching from Converging to Barbell horns while maintaining high ultrasonic amplitudes. If correctly scaled up, the processes generate the same reproducible results on the plant floor as they do in the laboratory.

Maximum achievable ultrasonic amplitude depends, primarily, on the properties of the material from which an ultrasonic horn is made as well as on the shape of its longitudinal cross-section. Commonly, the horns are made from titanium alloys, such as Ti6Al4V, stainless steel, such as 440C, and, sometimes, aluminum alloys or powdered metals. The most common and simple to make transitional section shapes are conical and catenoidal.

== Applications ==
=== Plastics ===
Consumer products, automotive components, medical devices and most all industries utilize Ultrasonics. Metal inserts may be secured in plastic and dissimilar materials can often be bonded with proper tooling design. Ultrasonic horns come in a variety of shapes and designs, but all must be tuned to a specific operating frequency; the most common being 15 kHz, 20 kHz, and 40 kHz.

Ultrasonic welding utilizes high frequency, vertical motion to produce heat and the flow of thermoplastic material at the interface of mated parts. Pressure is maintained after the delivery of energy is stopped to allow re-solidification of interwoven plastic at the joint, securing the parts with a homogeneous or mechanical bond. This process offers an environmentally friendly means of assembly as opposed to conventional adhesives or mechanical fasteners.
