= Nebulizer =

Drug delivery device

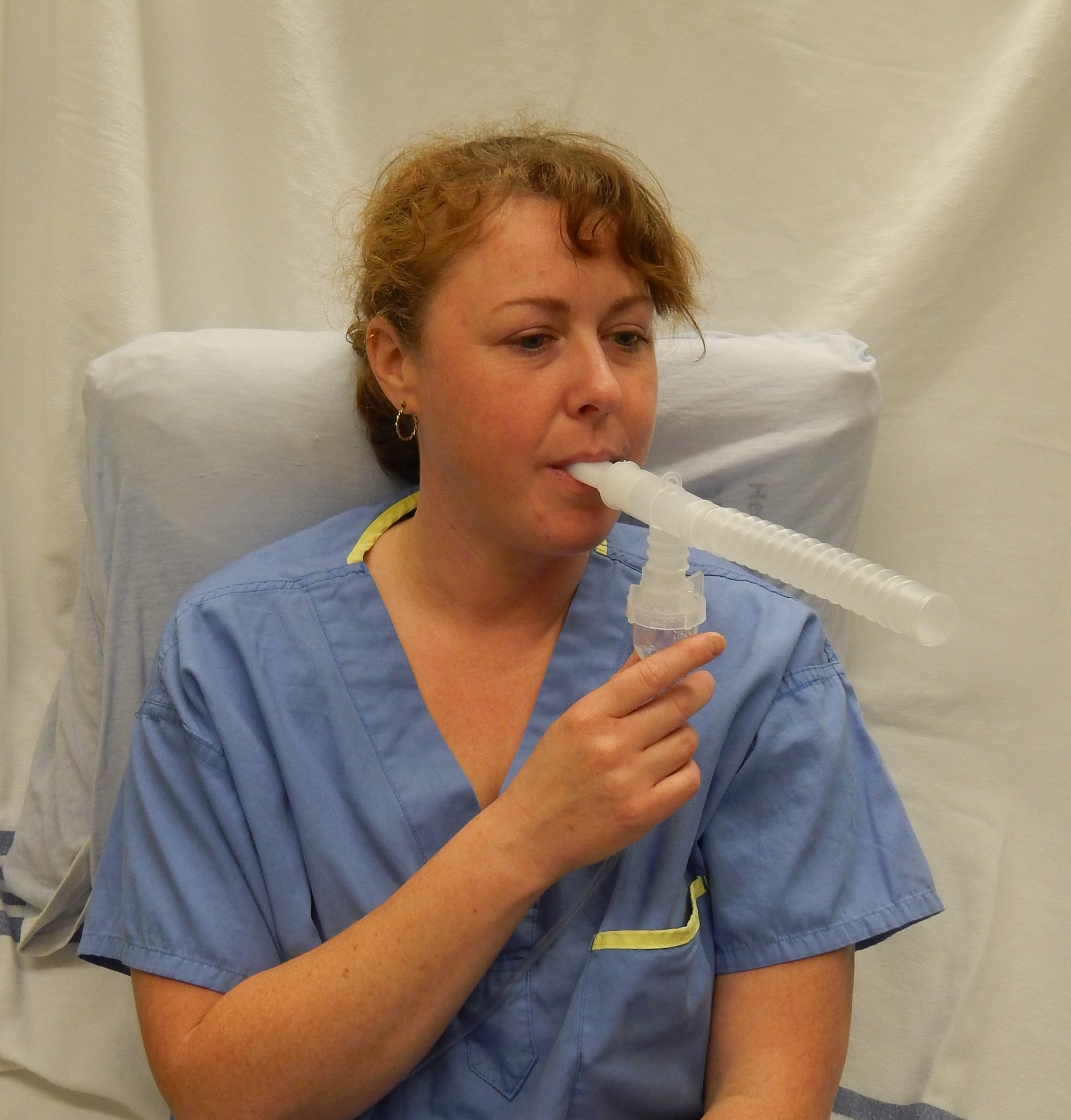
- A hospital nebulizer setup
- Specialty: pulmonology
- [edit on Wikidata]

In medicine, a nebulizer (American English) or nebuliser (English) is a drug delivery device used to administer medication in the form of a mist inhaled into the lungs. Nebulizers are commonly used for the treatment of asthma, cystic fibrosis, COPD and other respiratory diseases or disorders. They use oxygen, compressed air or ultrasonic power to break up solutions and suspensions into small aerosol droplets that are inhaled from the mouthpiece of the device. An aerosol is a mixture of a gas and solid or liquid particles.

== Medical uses ==
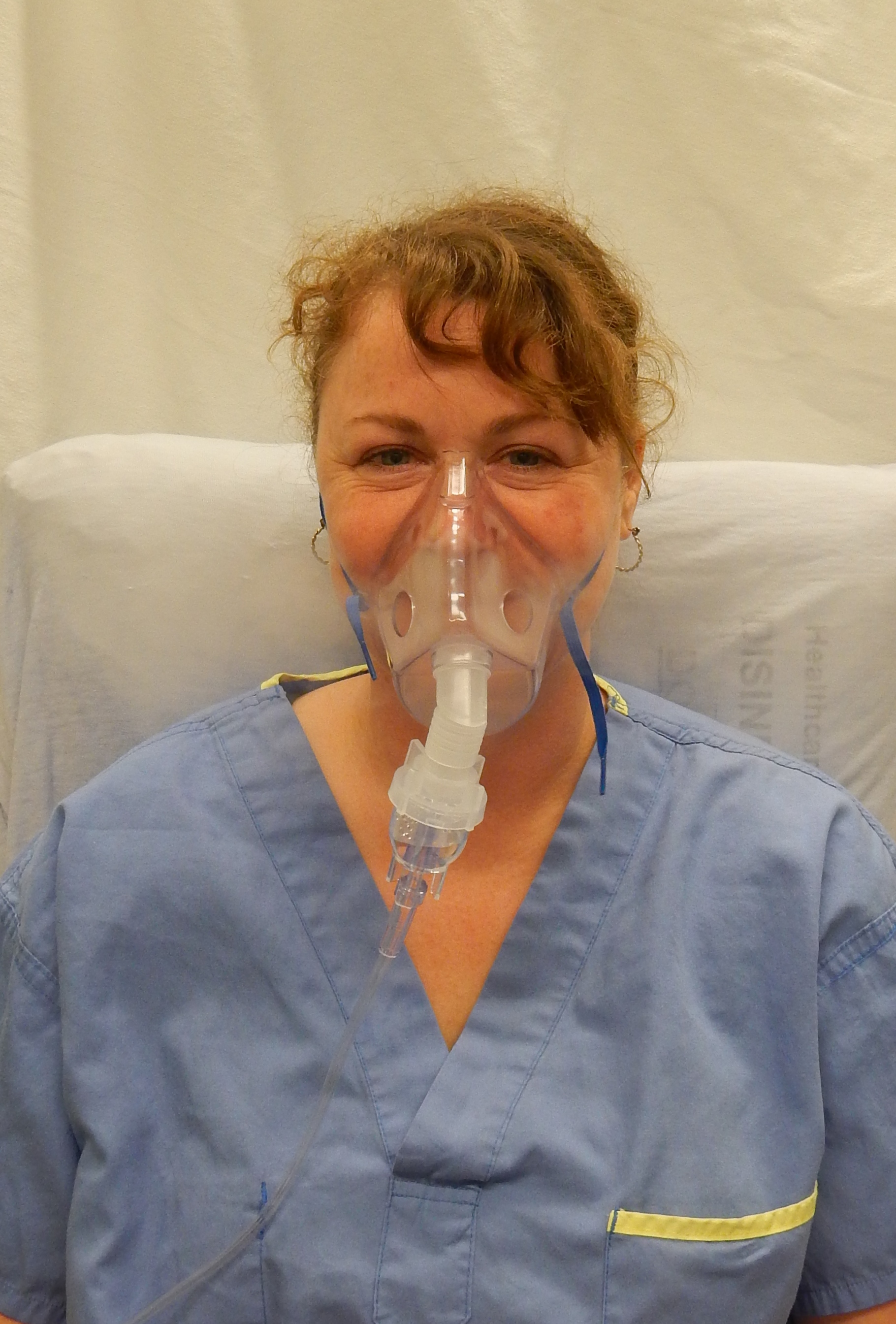
Another form of nebulization

=== Guidelines ===
Various asthma guidelines, such as the Global Initiative for Asthma Guidelines [GINA], the British Guidelines on the management of Asthma, The Canadian Pediatric Asthma Consensus Guidelines, and United States Guidelines for Diagnosis and Treatment of Asthma each recommend metered dose inhalers in place of nebulizer-delivered therapies. The European Respiratory Society acknowledges that although nebulizers are used in hospitals and at home they suggest much of this use may not be evidence-based.

=== Effectiveness ===
Recent evidence shows that nebulizers are no more effective than metered-dose inhalers (MDIs) with spacers. An MDI with a spacer may offer advantages to children who have acute asthma. Those findings refer specifically to the treatment of asthma and not to the efficacy of nebulisers generally, as for COPD for example. For COPD, especially when assessing exacerbations or lung attacks, there is no evidence to indicate that MDI (with a spacer) delivered medicine is more effective than administration of the same medicine with a nebulizer.

The European Respiratory Society highlighted a risk relating to droplet size reproducibility caused by selling nebulizer devices separately from nebulized solution. They found this practice could vary droplet size 10-fold or more by changing from an inefficient nebulizer system to a highly efficient one. Two advantages attributed to nebulizers, compared to MDIs with spacers (inhalers), are their ability to deliver larger dosages at a faster rate, especially in acute asthma; however, recent data suggests actual lung deposition rates are the same. In addition, another trial found that an MDI (with spacer) had a lower required dose for clinical result compared to a nebulizer.

Beyond their use in chronic lung disease, nebulizers may also be used to treat acute issues like the inhalation of toxic substances. One such example is the treatment of inhalation of toxic hydrofluoric acid (HF) vapors. Calcium gluconate is a first-line treatment for HF exposure to the skin. By using a nebulizer, calcium gluconate is delivered to the lungs as an aerosol to counteract the toxicity of inhaled HF vapors.

== Aerosol deposition ==
The lung deposition characteristics and efficacy of an aerosol depend largely on the particle or droplet size. Generally, the smaller the particle the greater its chance of peripheral penetration and retention. However, for very fine particles below 0.5 μm in diameter there is a chance of avoiding deposition altogether and being exhaled. In 1966 the Task Group on Lung Dynamics, concerned mainly with the hazards of inhalation of environmental toxins, proposed a model for deposition of particles in the lung. This suggested that particles of more than 10 μm in diameter are most likely to deposit in the mouth and throat, for those of 5–10 μm diameter a transition from mouth to airway deposition occurs, and particles smaller than 5 μm in diameter deposit more frequently in the lower airways and are appropriate for pharmaceutical aerosols. Nebulizing processes have been modeled using computational fluid dynamics.

== Types ==
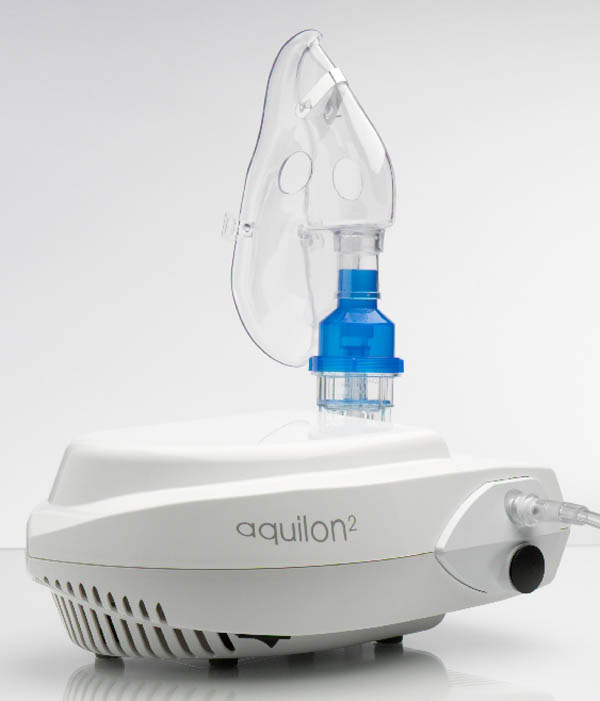
A modern jet nebulizer

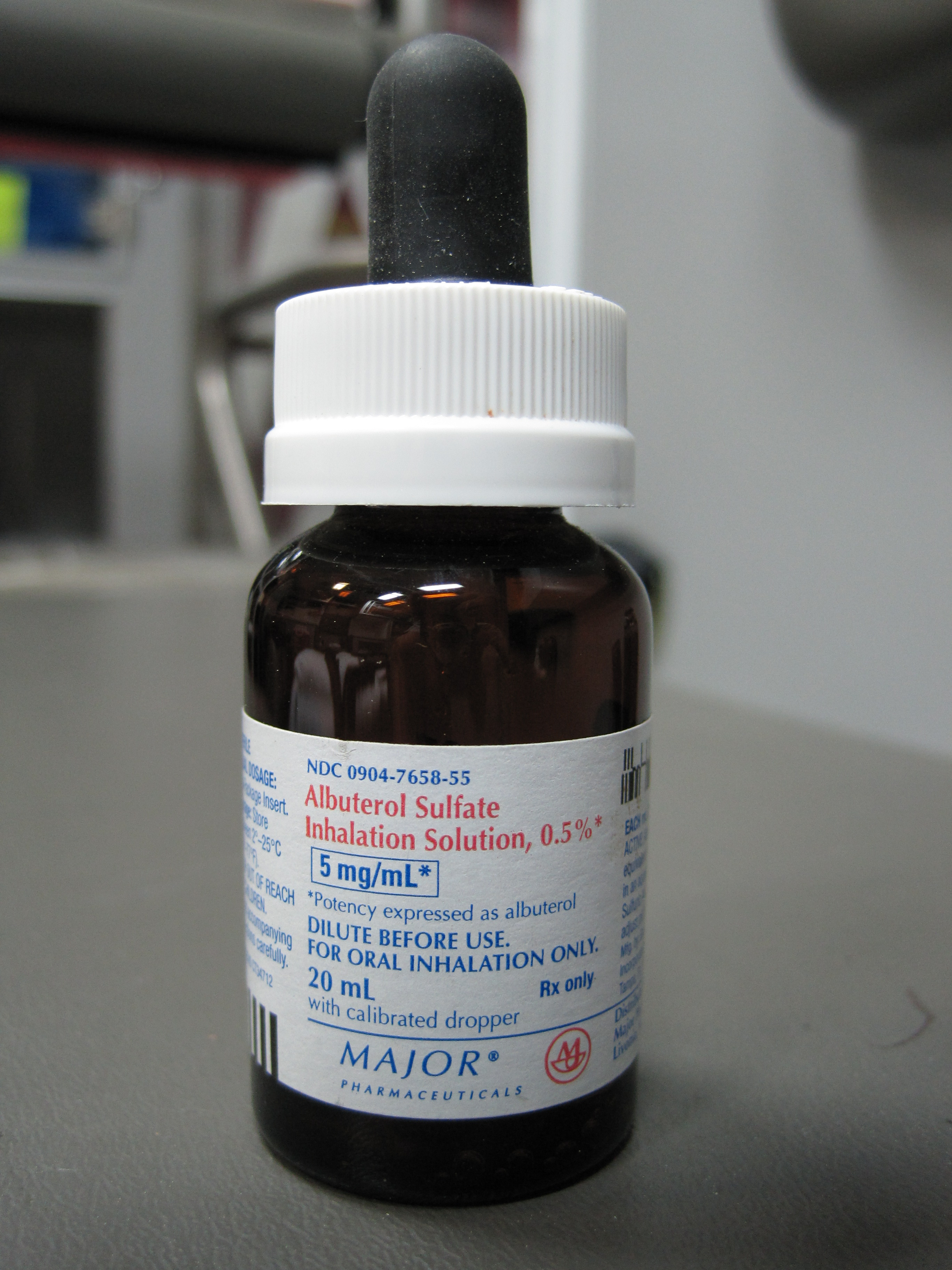
A vial of 0.5% albuterol sulfate inhalation solution for nebulizing

=== Pneumatic ===
==== Jet nebulizer ====
The most commonly used nebulizers are jet nebulizers, which are also called "atomizers". Jet nebulizers are connected by tubing to a supply of compressed gas, usually compressed air or oxygen to flow at high velocity through a liquid medicine to turn it into an aerosol that is inhaled by the patient. Currently, there seems to be a tendency among physicians to prefer prescription of a pressurized Metered Dose Inhaler (pMDI) for their patients, instead of a jet nebulizer that generates a lot more noise (often 60 dB during use) and is less portable due to a greater weight. However, jet nebulizers are commonly used in hospitals for patients who have difficulty using inhalers, such as in serious cases of respiratory disease, or severe asthma attacks. The main advantage of the jet nebulizer is related to its low operational cost. If the patient needs to inhale medicine on a daily basis the use of a pMDI can be rather expensive. Today several manufacturers have also managed to lower the weight of the jet nebulizer to just over 1/2 kilogram (≈ 1.3 lb), and therefore started to label it as a portable device. Compared to all the competing inhalers and nebulizers, the noise and heavy weight is still the biggest draw back of the jet nebulizer.

=== Mechanical ===
==== Soft mist inhaler ====
The medical company Boehringer Ingelheim also invented a device named Respimat Soft Mist Inhaler in 1997. This new technology provides a metered dose to the user, as the liquid bottom of the inhaler is rotated clockwise 180 degrees by hand, adding a buildup tension into a spring around the flexible liquid container. When the user activates the bottom of the inhaler, the energy from the spring is released and imposes pressure on the flexible liquid container, causing liquid to spray out of 2 nozzles, thus forming a soft mist to be inhaled. The device features no gas propellant and no need for battery/power to operate. The average droplet size in the mist was measured to 5.8 micrometers, which could indicate some potential efficiency problems for the inhaled medicine to reach the lungs. Subsequent trials have proven this was not the case. Due to the very low velocity of the mist, the Soft Mist Inhaler in fact has a higher efficiency compared to a conventional pMDI. In 2000, arguments were launched towards the European Respiratory Society (ERS) to clarify/expand their definition of a nebulizer, as the new Soft Mist Inhaler in technical terms both could be classified as a "hand driven nebulizer" and a "hand driven pMDI".

=== Electrical ===
==== Ultrasonic wave nebulizer ====
Ultrasonic wave nebulizers were invented in 1965 as a new type of portable nebulizer. The technology inside an ultrasonic wave nebulizer is to have an electronic oscillator generate a high frequency ultrasonic wave, which causes the mechanical vibration of a piezoelectric element. This vibrating element is in contact with a liquid reservoir and its high frequency vibration is sufficient to produce a vapor mist via ultrasonic atomization. As they create aerosols from ultrasonic vibration instead of using a heavy air compressor, they only have a weight around 170 grams (6.0 oz). Another advantage is that the ultrasonic vibration is almost silent. Examples of these more modern type of nebulizers are: Omron NE-U17 and Beurer Nebulizer IH30.

==== Vibrating mesh technology ====
A new significant innovation was made in the nebulizer market around 2005, with creation of the ultrasonic Vibrating Mesh Technology (VMT). With this technology a mesh/membrane with 1000–7000 laser drilled holes vibrates at the top of the liquid reservoir, and thereby pressures out a mist of very fine droplets through the holes. This technology is more efficient than having a vibrating piezoelectric element at the bottom of the liquid reservoir, and thereby shorter treatment times are also achieved. The old problems found with the ultrasonic wave nebulizer, having too much liquid waste and undesired heating of the medical liquid, have also been solved by the new vibrating mesh nebulizers. Available VMT nebulizers include: Pari eFlow, Respironics i-Neb, Beurer Nebulizer IH50, and Aerogen Aeroneb. As the price of the ultrasonic VMT nebulizers is higher than models using previous technologies, most manufacturers continue to also sell the classic jet nebulizers.

== Use and attachments ==
Nebulizers accept their medicine in the form of a liquid solution, which is often loaded into the device upon use. Corticosteroids and bronchodilators such as salbutamol (albuterol USAN) are often used, and sometimes in combination with ipratropium. The reason these pharmaceuticals are inhaled instead of ingested is in order to target their effect to the respiratory tract, which speeds onset of action of the medicine and reduces side effects, compared to other alternative intake routes.

Usually, the aerosolized medicine is inhaled through a tube-like mouthpiece, similar to that of an inhaler. The mouthpiece, however, is sometimes replaced with a face mask, similar to that used for inhaled anesthesia, for ease of use with young children or the elderly. Pediatric masks are often shaped like animals such as fish, dogs or dragons to make children less resistant to nebulizer treatments. Many nebulizer manufacturers also offer pacifier attachments for infants and toddlers. But mouthpieces are preferable if patients are able to use them since face-masks result in reduced lung delivery because of aerosol losses in the nose.

After use with corticosteroid, it is theoretically possible for patients to develop a yeast infection in the mouth (thrush) or hoarseness of voice (dysphonia), although these conditions are clinically very rare. To avoid these adverse effects, some clinicians suggest that the person who used the nebulizer should rinse his or her mouth. This is not true for bronchodilators; however, patients may still wish to rinse their mouths due to the unpleasant taste of some bronchodilating drugs.

== History ==
Sales-Girons pressurized nebulizer from 1858

The first "powered" or pressurized inhaler was invented in France by Sales-Girons in 1858. This device used pressure to atomize the liquid medication. The pump handle is operated like a bicycle pump. When the pump is pulled up, it draws liquid from the reservoir, and upon the force of the user's hand, the liquid is pressurized through an atomizer, to be sprayed out for inhalation near the user's mouth.

In 1864, the first steam-driven nebulizer was invented in Germany. This inhaler, known as "Siegle's steam spray inhaler", used the Venturi principle to atomize liquid medication, and this was the very beginning of nebulizer therapy. The importance of droplet size was not yet understood, so the efficacy of this first device was unfortunately mediocre for many of the medical compounds. The Siegle steam spray inhaler consisted of a spirit burner, which boiled water in the reservoir into steam that could then flow across the top and into a tube suspended in the pharmaceutical solution. The passage of steam drew the medicine into the vapor, and the patient inhaled this vapor through a mouthpiece made of glass.

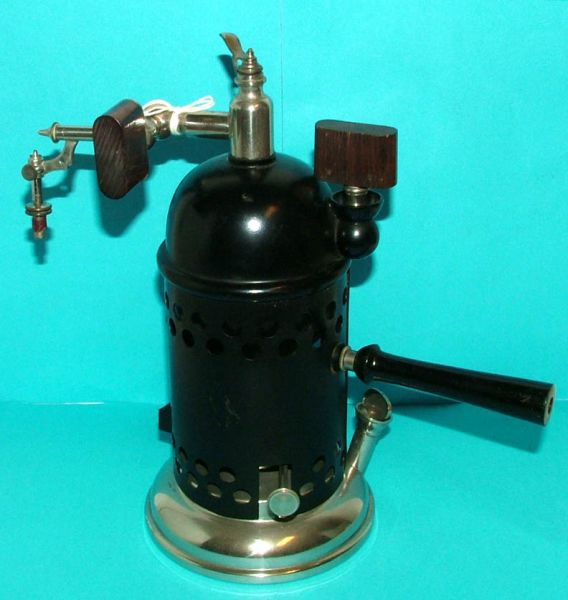
Dr Siegle's steam nebulizer, Thackray Museum of Medicine

The first pneumatic nebulizer fed from an electrically driven gas (air) compressor was invented in the 1930s and called a Pneumostat. With this device, a medical liquid (typically epinephrine chloride, used as a bronchial muscle relaxant to reverse constriction). As an alternative to the expensive electrical nebulizer, many people in the 1930s continued to use the much more simple and cheap hand-driven nebulizer, known as the Parke-Davis Glaseptic.

In 1956, a technology competing against the nebulizer was launched by Riker Laboratories (3M), in the form of pressurized metered-dose inhalers, with Medihaler-iso (isoprenaline) and Medihaler-epi (epinephrine) as the two first products. In these devices, the drug is cold-fill and delivered in exact doses through some special metering valves, driven by a gas propellant technology (i.e. Freon or a less environmentally damaging HFA).

In 1964, a new type of electronic nebulizer was introduced: the "ultrasonic wave nebulizer". Today the nebulizing technology is not only used for medical purposes. Ultrasonic wave nebulizers are also used in humidifiers, to spray out water aerosols to moisten dry air in buildings.

Some of the first models of electronic cigarettes featured an ultrasonic wave nebulizer (having a piezoelectric element vibrating and creating high-frequency ultrasound waves, to cause vibration and atomization of liquid nicotine) in combination with a vapouriser (built as a spray nozzle with an electric heating element). The most common type of electronic cigarettes currently sold, however, omit the ultrasonic wave nebulizer, as it was not found to be efficient enough for this kind of device. Instead, the electronic cigarettes now use an electric vaporizer, either in direct contact with the absorbent material in the "impregnated atomizer," or in combination with the nebulization technology related to a "spraying jet atomizer" (in the form of liquid droplets being out-sprayed by a high-speed air stream, that passes through some small venturi injection channels, drilled in a material absorbed with nicotine liquid).

== See also ==
- Heated humidified high-flow therapy
- Inhaler
- Humidifier
- Vaporizer
- List of medical inhalants
- Spray bottle
