= Metal powder =

Metal broken down to powder form

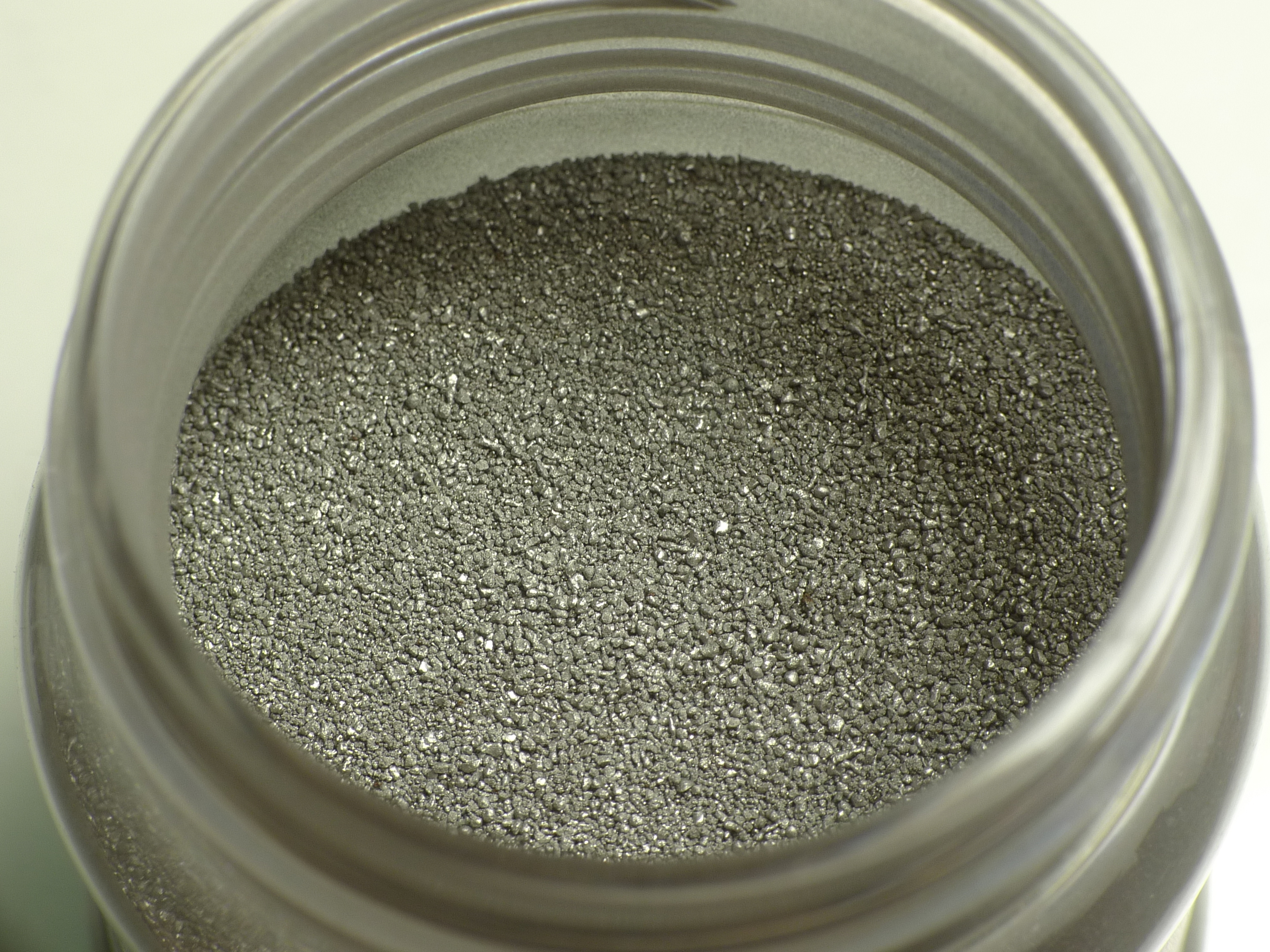
Iron powder

Metal powder is a metal that has been broken down into a powder form. Metals that can be found in powder form include aluminium powder, nickel powder, iron powder and many more. There are four different ways metals can be broken down into this powder form:

- Direct reduction
- Gas atomization
- Ultrasonic atomization
- Liquid atomization
- Centrifugal atomization

== Processes ==
The following processes can be used to produce metal powder:

1. Direct reduction is the result of blending carbon with iron oxide ore, heating the mixture, removing the sponge iron from the carbon, grinding it, annealing it, and regrinding to make the powder form usable for manufacturing.
2. Gas atomization occurs when a molten metal is passed through a passageway to a gas-filled chamber that cools the metal. As it falls, it is collected and annealed into a powder. The two predominant industrial gas atomization methods for additive manufacturing feedstock are vacuum induction-melting gas atomization (VIGA), in which the alloy is melted in a ceramic crucible before atomization, and electrode induction-melting gas atomization (EIGA), a crucible-free process where the tip of a rotating pre-alloyed electrode bar is melted by induction coils and the molten metal drips directly into the gas stream. EIGA avoids the contamination associated with crucible contact and is particularly suited for reactive alloys such as titanium and titanium aluminides.
3. Ultrasonic atomization uses high-frequency sound waves to break molten metal into uniformly spherical droplets. It offers precise particle size control, low contamination, high powder quality, and allows production with no minimum batch size. The equipment is typically compact, making it suitable for use in space-constrained environments.
4. Liquid atomization is similar to gas atomization, but instead the metal is sprayed with high-pressure liquid which solidifies the droplets more rapidly. This results in the powder being more porous, smaller, and cleaner.
5. Centrifugal atomization occurs when a metal is put into a chamber as a rod and electrically melted, at the end of the rod, to produce melted droplets that fall into another chamber and then solidify.

== Types and uses ==
The following are the types and uses of metal powder:

- Aluminium powder: fireworks, metallic paints, manufacturing in solar cells in the green energy sector
- Bismuth powder: production of batteries, welding rods, creating alloys
- Cadmium powder: glaze used on ceramics, transparent conductors, nickel-cadmium batteries
- Iron powder: magnetic products, printing, brake pads, certain types of dyes and stains
- Nickel powder: used for corrosion resistance, such as in the marine industry

- Raney nickel: used as a catalyst

- Platinum black: used as a catalyst
- Titanium powder: used in aerospace applications, medical implants and sporting goods

Many of these metal powders, particularly those with spherical morphology produced by gas atomization, are used as feedstock in additive manufacturing processes such as laser powder bed fusion, electron beam melting, and binder jetting.

== See also ==
- Metal swarf
- Powder metallurgy
- Pressing
- Sintering
