= Ultrasonic welding =

Welding process

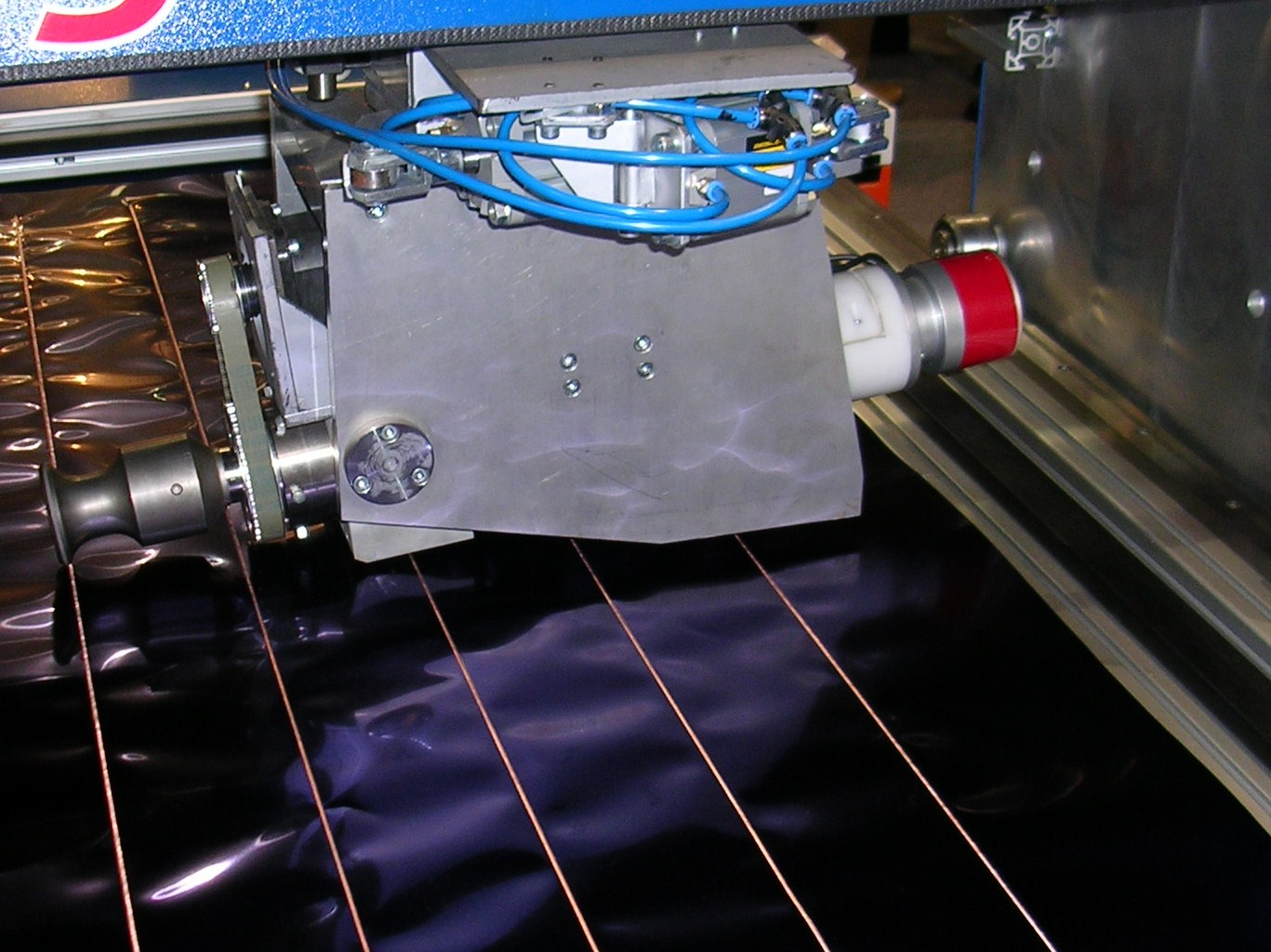
Ultrasonic welding of thin metallic foils. The sonotrode is rotated along the weld seam.

Ultrasonic welding is an industrial process whereby high-frequency ultrasonic acoustic vibrations are locally applied to work pieces being held together under pressure to create a solid-state weld. It is commonly used for plastics and metals, and especially for joining dissimilar materials. In ultrasonic welding, there are no connective bolts, nails, soldering materials, or adhesives necessary to bind the materials together. When used to join metals, the temperature stays well below the melting point of the involved materials, preventing any unwanted properties which may arise from high temperature exposure of the metal.

== History ==
Practical application of ultrasonic welding for rigid plastics was completed in the 1960s. At this point only hard plastics could be welded. The patent for the ultrasonic method for welding rigid thermoplastic parts was awarded to Robert Soloff and Seymour Linsley in 1965. Soloff, the founder of Sonics & Materials Inc., was a lab manager at Branson Instruments where thin plastic films were welded into bags and tubes using ultrasonic probes. He unintentionally moved the probe close to a plastic tape dispenser and observed that the halves of the dispenser welded together. He realized that the probe did not need to be manually moved around the part, but that the ultrasonic energy could travel through and around rigid plastics and weld an entire joint. He went on to develop the first ultrasonic press. The first application of this new technology was in the toy industry.

The first car made entirely out of plastic was assembled using ultrasonic welding in 1969. The automotive industry has used it regularly since the 1980s, and it is now used for a multitude of applications.

== Process ==
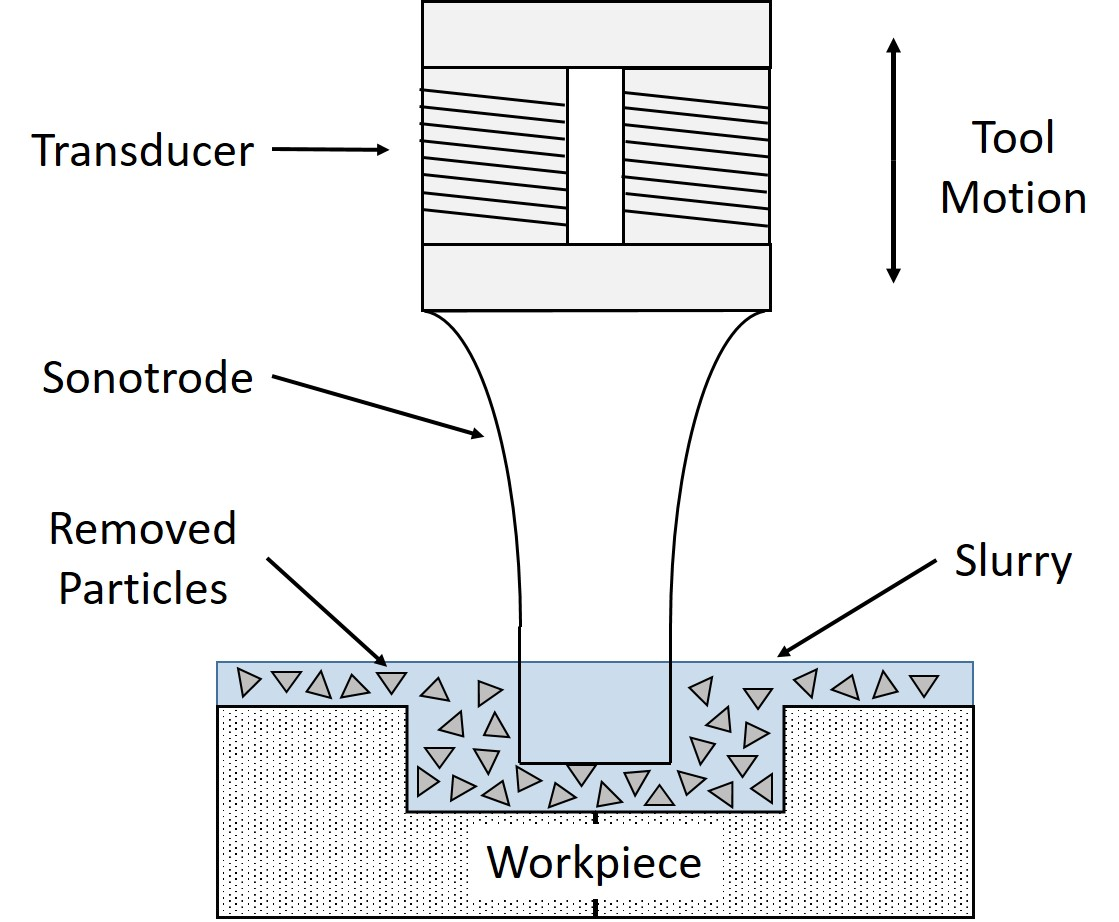
Ultrasonic Welding is similar to ultrasonic machining shown here, except the sonotrode does not remove material, but rather vibrates it

For joining complex injection molded thermoplastic parts, ultrasonic welding equipment can be customized to fit the exact specifications of the parts being welded. The parts are sandwiched between a fixed shaped nest (anvil) and a sonotrode (horn) connected to a transducer, and a ~20-70kHz low-amplitude acoustic vibration is emitted. When welding plastics, the interface of the two parts is specially designed to concentrate the melting process. One of the materials usually has a spiked or rounded energy director which contacts the second plastic part. The ultrasonic energy melts the point contact between the parts, creating a joint. Ultrasonic welding of thermoplastics causes local melting of the plastic due to absorption of vibrational energy along the joint to be welded. In metals, welding occurs due to high-pressure dispersion of surface oxides and local motion of the materials. Although there is heating, it is not enough to melt the base materials.

Ultrasonic welding can be used for both hard and soft plastics, such as semicrystalline plastics, and metals. The understanding of ultrasonic welding has increased with research and testing. The invention of more sophisticated and inexpensive equipment and increased demand for plastic and electronic components has led to a growing knowledge of the fundamental process. However, many aspects of ultrasonic welding still require more study, such as the relationship of weld quality to process parameters.

Scientists from the Institute of Materials Science and Engineering (WKK) of University of Kaiserslautern, with the support from the German Research Foundation (Deutsche Forschungsgemeinschaft), have succeeded in proving that using ultrasonic welding processes can lead to highly durable bonds between light metals and carbon-fiber-reinforced polymer (CFRP) sheets.

A benefit of ultrasonic welding is that there is no drying time as with conventional adhesives or solvents, so the workpieces do not need to remain in a fixture for longer than it takes for the weld to cool. The welding can easily be automated, making clean and precise joints; the site of the weld is very clean and rarely requires any touch-up work. The low thermal impact on the materials involved enables a greater number of materials to be welded together. The process is a good automated alternative to glue, screws or snap-fit designs.

Ultrasonic welding is typically used with small parts (e.g. cell phones, consumer electronics, disposable medical tools, toys, etc.) but it can be used on parts as large as a small automotive instrument cluster. Ultrasonics can also be used to weld metals, but are typically limited to small welds of thin, malleable metals such as aluminum, copper, and nickel. Ultrasonics would not be used in welding the chassis of an automobile or in welding pieces of a bicycle together, due to the power levels required.

== Components ==
All ultrasonic welding systems are composed of the same basic elements:

- A press, usually with a pneumatic or electric drive, to assemble two parts under pressure
- A nest or anvil or fixture where the parts are placed and allowing the high frequency vibration to be directed to the interfaces
- An ultrasonic stack composed of a converter or piezoelectric transducer, an optional booster and a Horn. All three elements of the stack are specifically tuned to resonate at the same exact ultrasonic frequency (Typically 15, 20, 30, 35 or 40 kHz)
  - Converter: Converts the electrical signal into a mechanical vibration using piezo electric effect
  - Booster: Modifies the amplitude of the vibration mechanically. It is also used in standard systems to clamp the stack in the press.
  - Horn: Takes the shape of the part, also modifies the amplitude mechanically and applies the mechanical vibration to the parts to be welded.
- An electronic ultrasonic generator (US: Power supply) delivering a high power electric signal with frequency matching the resonance frequency of the stack.
- A controller controlling the movement of the press and the delivery of the ultrasonic energy.

== Applications ==
The applications of ultrasonic welding are extensive and are found in many industries including electrical and computer, automotive and aerospace, medical, and packaging. Whether two items can be ultrasonically welded is determined by their thickness. If they are too thick this process will not join them. This is the main obstacle in the welding of metals. However, wires, microcircuit connections, sheet metal, foils, ribbons and meshes are often joined using ultrasonic welding. Ultrasonic welding is a very popular technique for bonding thermoplastics. It is fast and easily automated with weld times often below one second and there is no ventilation system required to remove heat or exhaust. This type of welding is often used to build assemblies that are too small, too complex, or too delicate for more common welding techniques.

=== Computer and electrical industries ===
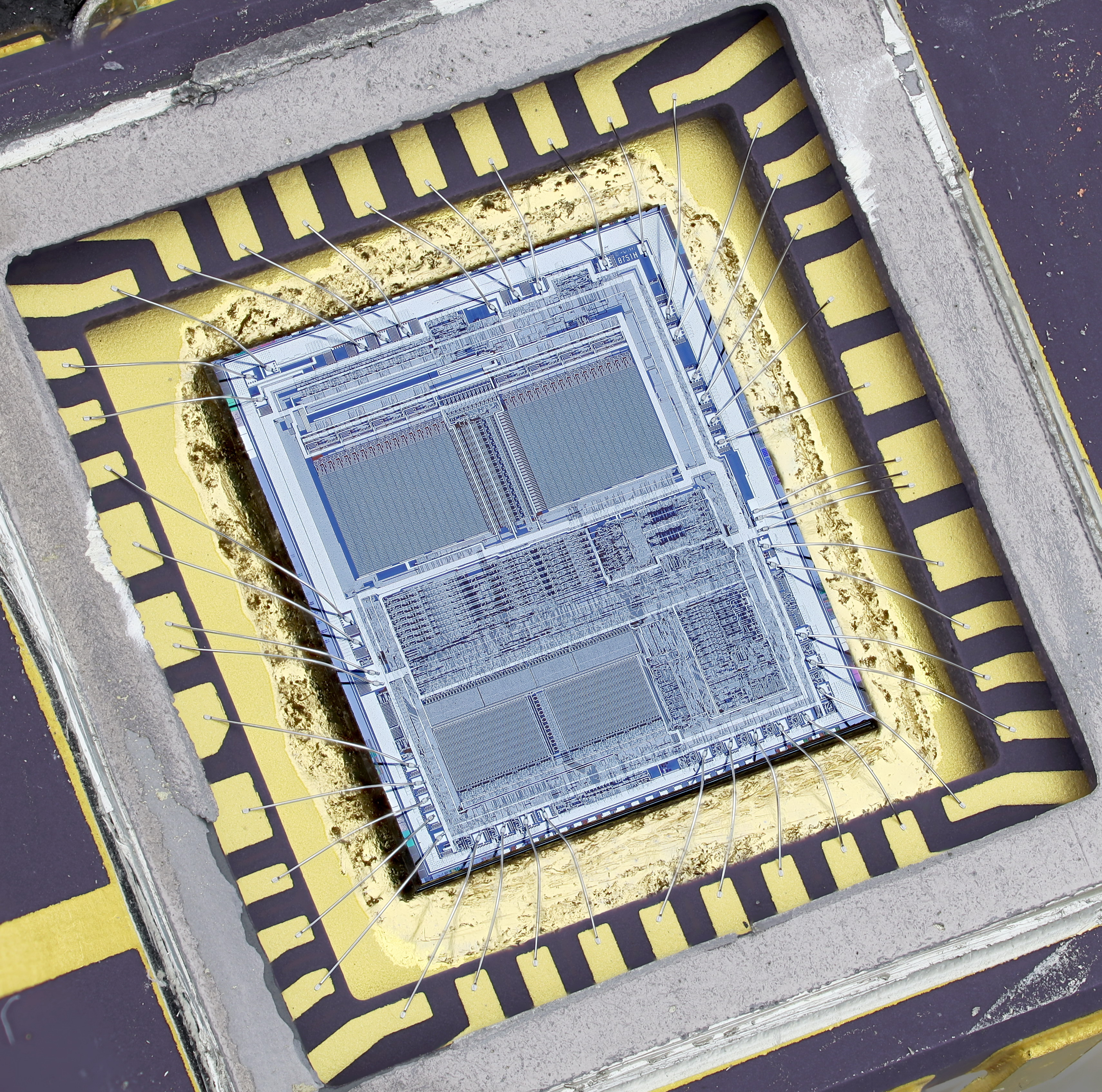
The thin aluminium wires around the edges of the Intel C8751H silicon die were wire bonded by ultrasound.

In the electrical and computer industry ultrasonic welding is often used to join wired connections and to create connections in small, delicate circuits. Junctions of wire harnesses are often joined using ultrasonic welding. Wire harnesses are large groupings of wires used to distribute electrical signals and power. Electric motors, field coils, transformers and capacitors may also be assembled with ultrasonic welding. It is also often preferred in the assembly of storage media such as flash drives and computer disks because of the high volumes required. Ultrasonic welding of computer disks has been found to have cycle times of less than 300 ms.

One of the areas in which ultrasonic welding is most used and where new research and experimentation is centered is microcircuits. This process is ideal for microcircuits since it creates reliable bonds without introducing impurities or thermal distortion into components. Semiconductor devices, transistors and diodes are often connected by thin aluminum and gold wires using ultrasonic welding. It is also used for bonding wiring and ribbons as well as entire chips to microcircuits. An example of where microcircuits are used is in medical sensors used to monitor the human heart in bypass patients.

One difference between ultrasonic welding and traditional welding is the ability of ultrasonic welding to join dissimilar materials. The assembly of battery components is a good example of where this ability is utilized. When creating battery and fuel cell components, thin gauge copper, nickel and aluminium connections, foil layers and metal meshes are often ultrasonically welded together. Multiple layers of foil or mesh can often be applied in a single weld eliminating steps and costs.

=== Aerospace and automotive industries ===
For automobiles, ultrasonic welding tends to be used to assemble large plastic and electrical components such as instrument panels, door panels, lamps, air ducts, steering wheels, upholstery and engine components. As plastics have continued to replace other materials in the design and manufacture of automobiles, the assembly and joining of plastic components has increasingly become a critical issue. Some of the advantages for ultrasonic welding are low cycle times, automation, low capital costs, and flexibility. Ultrasonic welding does not damage surface finish because the high-frequency vibrations prevent marks from being generated, which is a crucial consideration for many car manufacturers, .

Ultrasonic welding is generally utilized in the aerospace industry when joining thin sheet gauge metals and other lightweight materials. Aluminum is a difficult metal to weld using traditional techniques because of its high thermal conductivity. However, it is one of the easier materials to weld using ultrasonic welding because it is a softer metal and thus a solid-state weld is simple to achieve. Since aluminum is so widely used in the aerospace industry, it follows that ultrasonic welding is an important manufacturing process. With the advent of new composite materials, ultrasonic welding is becoming even more prevalent. It has been used in the bonding of the popular composite material carbon fiber. Numerous studies have been done to find the optimum parameters that will produce quality welds for this material.

=== Medical industry ===
In the medical industry ultrasonic welding is often used because it does not introduce contaminants or degradation into the weld and the machines can be specialized for use in clean rooms. The process can also be highly automated, provides strict control over dimensional tolerances and does not interfere with the biocompatibility of parts. Therefore, it increases part quality and decreases production costs. Items such as arterial filters, anesthesia filters, blood filters, IV catheters, dialysis tubes, pipettes, cardiometry reservoirs, blood/gas filters, face masks and IV spike/filters can all be made using ultrasonic welding. Another important application in the medical industry for ultrasonic welding is textiles. Items like hospital gowns, sterile garments, masks, transdermal patches and textiles for clean rooms can be sealed and sewn using ultrasonic welding. This prevents contamination and dust production and reduces the risk of infection.

=== Packaging industry ===
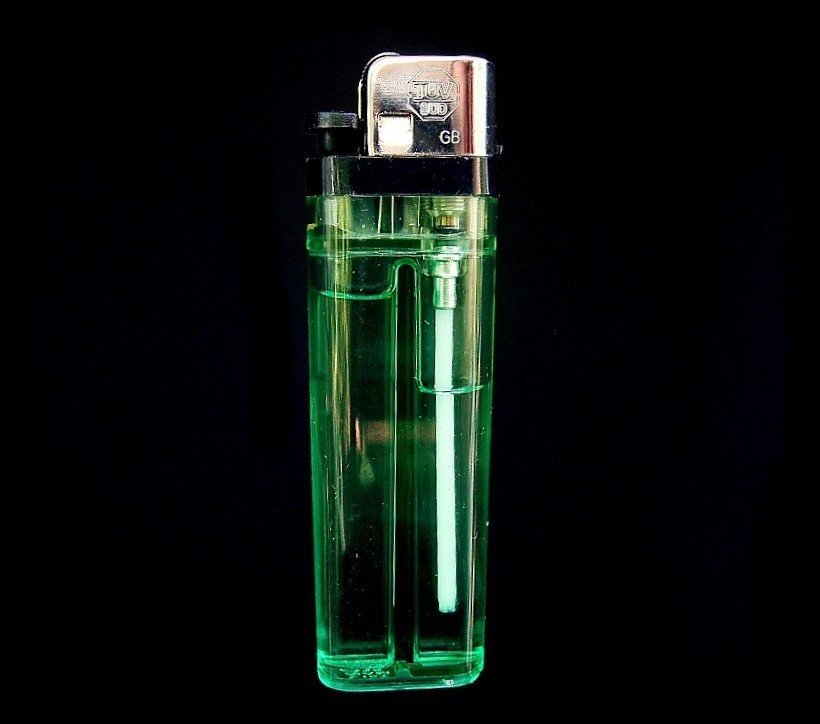
Butane lighter

Ultrasonic welding is often used in packaging applications. Many common items are either created or packaged using ultrasonic welding. Sealing containers, tubes and blister packs are common applications.

Ultrasonic welding is also applied in the packaging of dangerous materials, such as explosives, fireworks and other reactive chemicals. These items tend to require hermetic sealing, but cannot be subjected to high temperatures. One example is a butane lighter. This container weld must be able to withstand high pressure and stress and must be airtight to contain the butane. Another example is the packaging of ammunition and propellants. These packages must be able to withstand high pressure and stress to protect the consumer from the contents.

The food industry finds ultrasonic welding preferable to traditional joining techniques, because it is fast, sanitary and can produce hermetic seals. Milk and juice containers are examples of products often sealed using ultrasonic welding. The paper parts to be sealed are coated with plastic, generally polypropylene or polyethylene, and then welded together to create an airtight seal. The main obstacle to overcome in this process is the setting of the parameters. For example, if over-welding occurs, then the concentration of plastic in the weld zone may be too low and cause the seal to break. If it is under-welded, the seal is incomplete. Variations in the thicknesses of materials can cause variations in weld quality. Some other food items sealed using ultrasonic welding include candy bar wrappers, frozen food packages and beverage containers.

=== Experimental ===
"Sonic agglomeration", a combination of ultrasonic welding and molding, is used to produce compact food ration bars for the US Army's Close Combat Assault Ration project without the use of binders. Dried food is pressed into a mold and welded for an hour, during which food particles become stuck together.

== Safety ==
Hazards of ultrasonic welding include exposure to high temperatures and voltages. This equipment should be operated using the safety guidelines provided by the manufacturer to avoid injury. For instance, operators must never place hands or arms near the welding tip when the machine is activated. Also, operators should be provided with hearing protection and safety glasses. Operators should be informed of government agency regulations for the ultrasonic welding equipment and these regulations should be enforced.

Ultrasonic welding machines require routine maintenance and inspection. Panel doors, housing covers and protective guards may need to be removed for maintenance. This should be done when the power to the equipment is off and only by the trained professional servicing the machine.

Sub-harmonic vibrations, which can create annoying audible noise, may be caused in larger parts near the machine due to the ultrasonic welding frequency. This noise can be damped by clamping these large parts at one or more locations. Also, high-powered welders with frequencies of 15 kHz and 20 kHz typically emit a potentially damaging high-pitched squeal in the range of human hearing. Shielding this radiating sound can be done using an acoustic enclosure.

== See also ==
- Hot stapler
- Hot air gun
- Thermoforming
- Thermosonic bonding
