= Sonotrode =

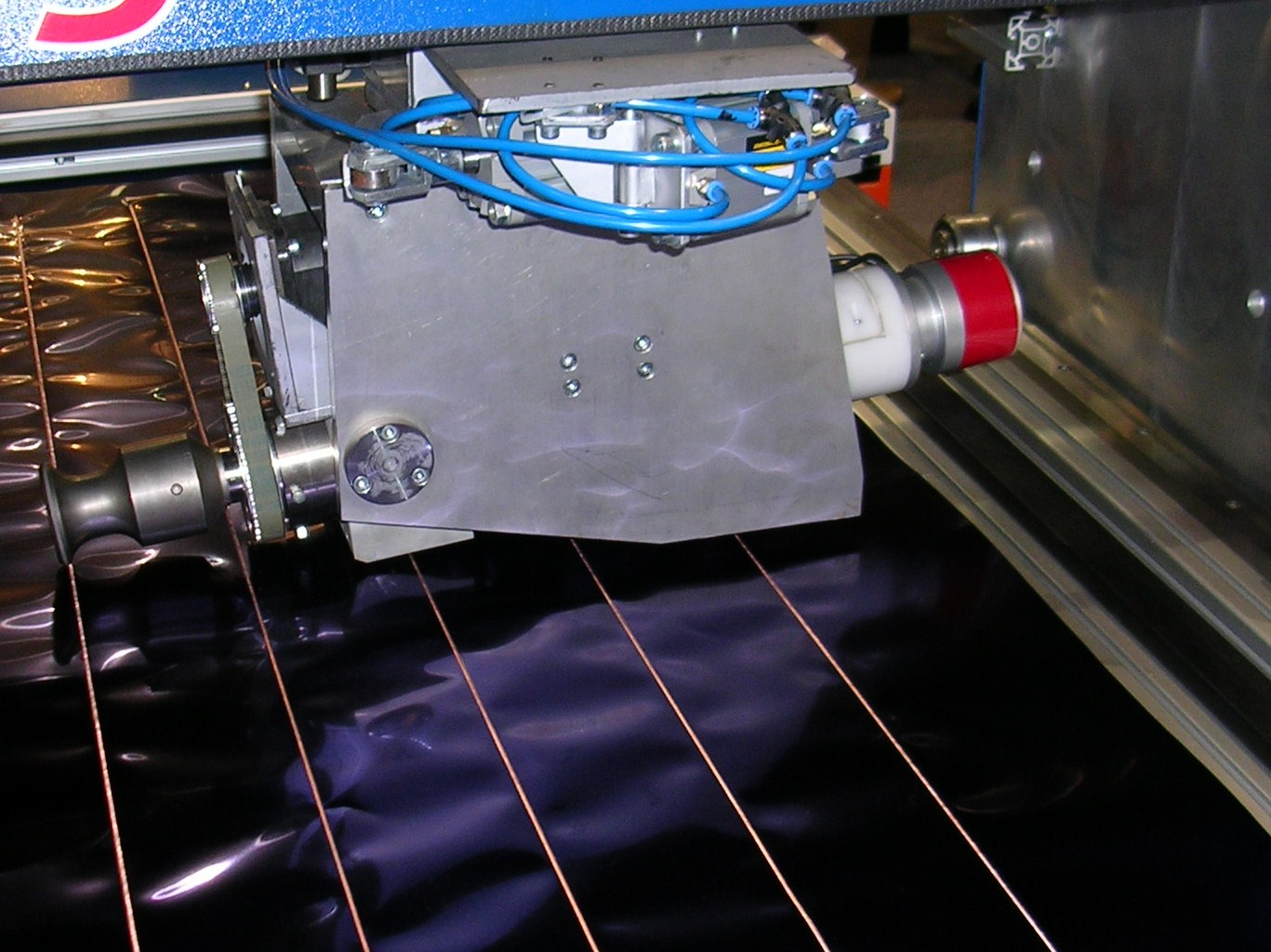
Rotating sonotrode during ultrasonic welding of thin metallic foils.

In ultrasonic machining, welding and mixing, a sonotrode is a tool that creates ultrasonic vibrations and applies this vibrational energy to a gas, liquid, solid or tissue.

A sonotrode usually consists of a stack of piezoelectric transducers attached to a tapering metal rod. The end of the rod is applied to the working material. An alternating current oscillating at ultrasonic frequency is applied by a separate power supply unit to the piezoelectric transducers. The current causes them to expand and contract. The frequency of the current is chosen to be the resonant frequency of the tool, so the entire sonotrode acts as a half-wavelength resonator, vibrating lengthwise with standing waves at its resonant frequency. The standard frequencies used with ultrasonic sonotrodes range from 20 kHz to 70 kHz. The amplitude of the vibration is small, about 13 to 130 micrometres.

Sonotrodes are made of titanium, aluminium or steel, with or without heat treatment (carbide). The shape of the sonotrode (round, square, with teeth, profiled ...), depends on the quantity of vibratory energy and a physical constraint for a specific application. Its shape must be optimized for the particular application.

Sonotrodes of small diameter are sometimes called probes.

For an ultrasonic welding or cutting application, the sonotrode gives energy directly to the welding contact area, with little diffraction. This is particularly helpful when vibrations (wave propagation) could damage surrounding electronic components.

== See also ==
- Horn analyzer
- Ultrasonic horn
