= Bruno Georges Pollet =

French electrochemist (born 1969)

Bruno G. Pollet
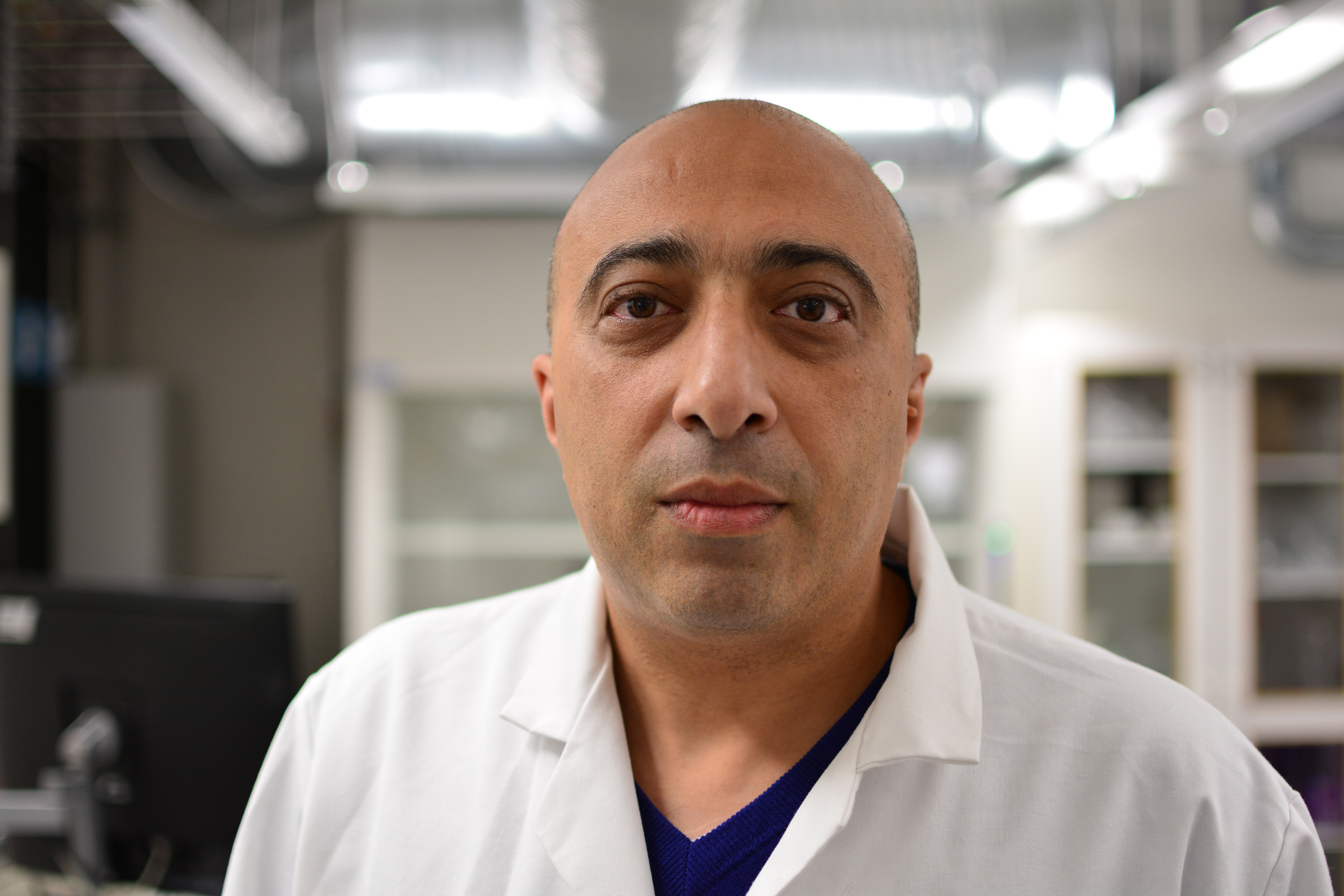
- Pollet in 2019
- Born: 1969 (age 56–57); Orléans, France
- Citizenship: France
- Education: Université Joseph Fourier (Université Grenoble Alpes)(DUT); Coventry University (BSc(Hons)); The University of Aberdeen (MSc); Coventry University (PhD); The University of Birmingham (AHEA)
- Known for: Hydrogen, Sonoelectrochemistry, Sonoelectrocatalysis and Sonocatalysis
- Awards: Fellow of the IChemE (Institution of Chemical Engineers) (2026); Fellow of the IAHE (International Association for Hydrogen Energy) (2024); SCI Canada International (Society of Chemical Industry) (2024); IAHE Sir William Grove (2022); Fellow of the Royal Society of Chemistry (2010)
- Scientific career
- Fields: Hydrogen; Fuel cell; Electrolyzer; Electrocatalysis; Electrochemistry; Sonoelectrochemistry; Electrochemical engineering
- Workplaces: Johnson Matthey (UK); SmartWater (UK); Albion Chemicals Ltd now Brenntag (UK); Banner Chemicals Group (UK); Coldharbour Marine Ltd (UK); KP2M t/a Power and Water (UK); Liverpool University (UK); University of Birmingham (UK); Ulster University (UK); Yamanashi University (Japan); University of the Western Cape (South Africa); Norwegian University of Science and Technology (Norway); Université de Franche-Comté (France); Université du Québec à Trois-Rivières (Canada)
- Thesis: The Effect of Ultrasound on Electrochemical Processes sonoelectrochemistry
- Doctoral advisors: Timothy J. Mason and J. Phil Lorimer

Bruno Georges Pollet BSc(Hons) MSc PhD AHEA FIAHE FRSC FIChemE (born in 1969, French national and Canadian permanent resident), is an electrochemist and electrochemical engineer, a Fellow of the Royal Society of Chemistry (UK), a Fellow of the Institution of Chemical Engineers (UK), a Fellow of the International Association for Hydrogen Energy (USA), a full professor of chemistry, director of the Clean Hydrogen Lab and co-director of the Hydrogen Research Institute (Institut de recherche sur l'hydrogène) at the Université du Québec à Trois-Rivières in Canada. He has worked on Hydrogen Energy in the UK, Japan, South Africa, Norway and Canada, and has both industrial and academic experience. He has been involved in Hydrogen strategies in various countries. He is a prolific scholar, collaborator, and mentor. He is also regarded as one of the most prominent Hydrogen experts and one of the Hydrogen "influencers" in the world.

== Early life and education ==
Bruno G. Pollet was born in Orléans and grew up in Grenoble, France. He was educated in France, England (through the Erasmus Programme) and Scotland. Prior to entering the French university system, he did his Terminale C (baccalaureat C - mathematics and physical sciences) at the Lycée Pierre du Terrail (high school), where he studied with the French researcher and infectiologist, specialist in HIV, hepatitis and Covid-19, Karine Lacombe. He received a Diploma in Chemistry and Materials Science at the Université Joseph Fourier, Grenoble, France (1991), a Bachelor's Honours Degree in Applied Chemistry at Coventry University, England (1992), a Masters Degree in Analytical Chemistry at the University of Aberdeen, Scotland (1994) and a Ph.D. Degree in electrochemistry with the dissertation "The Effect of Ultrasound on Electrochemical Processes" at the Sonochemistry Centre of Excellence, School of Chemistry, Coventry University in England (1998) under the supervision of Professors Tim J. Mason (sonochemist) and John P. Lorimer (physical chemist). He was also a Postdoctoral researcher in Electrocatalysis at the University of Liverpool Electrochemistry Group led by Professor David J. Schiffrin (2001) in the UK. He was offered and turned down a 3-year Postdoctoral Research Assistant (PDRA) position at the Compton Electrochemistry Group at Oxford University in the UK (1998), a 2-year Postdoctoral researcher position at The Australian National University Electrochemistry Group in Australia (2001) and a 1-year Postdoctoral researcher position at the Allen J. Bard Electrochemistry Group at the University of Texas at Austin in the US (2001).

== Memberships, awards and invitations ==
He is a member of the Council of Engineers for the Energy Transition (CEET): An Independent Advisory Council to the United Nations’ Secretary-General and CEET Hydrogen Task Force leader. He is also member of the United Nations Economic Commission for Europe (UNECE) Hydrogen Task Force, the “Renewable Hydrogen” task of the International Energy Agency (IEA) Hydrogen Technology Collaboration Program (TCP) and the IEA Technology Collaboration Programme on Advanced Fuel Cells. He also has the role of “Ambassador” for the IEA H2-TCP/Task 45 in IEA AFC-TCP/Task 30. He is President of the Clean Hydrogen Division (previously Green Hydrogen Division) of the International Association for Hydrogen Energy, member of the Board of Directors and Executive Vice President of the International Association for Hydrogen Energy (IAHE), member of the Board of Directors of the Canadian Hydrogen Association (CHA), member of the Board of Directors of the Canadian Hydrogen Safety Centre (CH2SC), member of the Advisory Board of the National Research Council Canada (NRC)'s Clean Energy Innovation (CEI), leader of H2CAN 2.0 (a cluster of hydrogen R&D groups in Canada), Canadian leader of the CNRS International Research Network (IRN) on Clean Hydrogen between France and Canada, member of the Global Hydrogen Production Technologies (HyPT) Center and member of the Strategy Board of HyCentA (Hydrogen Research Centre Austria). Since August 2025, he is a member of the International Technical Advisory Board of the Institute of Catalysis and Energy Solutions, The University of South Africa and a member of the Advisory Board of the Horizon Europe project called “Research Infrastructure Services for Renewable Energy RISEnergy”, funded by the European Commission. He was member of the Board of Directors of Hydrogène Québec from 2022-2024, member of PROMICON (EU Horizon 2020 project) Innovation Board from 2024-2025 and member of the High Level Expert group of STORMING (STructured unconventional reactors for CO2 -fRee Methane catalytic crackING, EU Horizon 2020 project) from 2022-2025. He is member of the Electrochemical Society, member of the International Society of Electrochemistry and member of the Board of the European Society of Sonochemistry. He is also a member of the Scientific Advisory Board of the Canadian electrolyzer company, Hydrogen Optimised, led by the Stuart family, which builds on a heritage of more than 100 years in the design of unipolar alkaline water electrolysis cells and plants, that has delivered 1 billion operating hours in approximately 1,000 hydrogen plants in 100 countries. He was Scientific Advisor of TES Canada H2 Inc., one of the largest producers of renewable hydrogen and natural gas in Canada and Scientific Advisor of Cipher Neutron Inc., the only Canadian technology company focussing on disruptive AEM electrolyser technologies. He is also Scientific Advisor at Innovation et Développement économique Trois-Rivières (IDETR). He was "Hydrogen Champion" and Scientific Committee member of the Energy Transition Valley (Vallée de la Transition Énergétique - VTÉ) from 2023-2024. He was awarded two prestigious research chairs: NSERC Tier 1 Canada Research Chair in Clean Hydrogen (previously known as Green hydrogen Production), and the Innergex Renewable Energy Research Chair (partly funded by the Québec Ministère de l'Économie, de l'Innovation et de l'Énergie) focussing on the next generation of hydrogen production and water electrolyzers (electrolysis of water). He was awarded the "IAHE Sir William Grove Award" in recognition of his leadership and his groundbreaking works in hydrogen, fuel cell and electrolyser technologies by the International Association for Hydrogen Energy (IAHE) as well as the "SCI Canada International Award" by the Society of Chemical Industry (SCI) in recognition of outstanding service and contributions in the international sphere to an industry that is based on Chemistry, for its processes and/or services. During his time at the University of Birmingham Centre for Hydrogen and Fuel Cell Research, he was named as "Birmingham Hero" for his hydrogen and fuel cell works. In Norway, together with Torstein Dale Sjøtveit, he was a member of the foundation group for the establishment of FREYR Battery (lithium-ion battery manufacturer). In 2022, Bruno G. Pollet was invited to witness at the Senate Committee on Energy, the Environment and Natural Resources and the Standing Committee on Environment and Sustainable Development, the House of Commons in Canada. In 2024, he initiated and was the catalyst for the establishment of the Memorandum of Understanding (MoU) between Hydrogen Europe and the Canadian Hydrogen Association to accelerate hydrogen deployment and facilitate trade in clean molecules. In June 2024, he was awarded Fellow of the IAHE for his persistent promotion of Green hydrogen Technologies. In October 2024, he led the Université du Québec à Trois-Rivières to be the first transatlantic university to join Hydrogen Europe Research, a hydrogen association that brings together the best leading universities, research organisations and R&D labs in Europe. In 2025, he is one of the co-founders of the Pan-Canadian Hydrogen Hubs Alliance, in collaboration with four major national partners: Simon Fraser University’s Clean Hydrogen Hub (British Columbia), the Newfoundland and Labrador Hydrogen Innovation Partnership (Newfoundland and Labrador), the Edmonton Regional Hydrogen Hub (Alberta) and the Atlantic Hydrogen Alliance (Nova Scotia).

== Research and teaching ==
His research field covers a wide range of areas within electrochemistry, electrochemical engineering, electrochemical energy conversion and sonoelectrochemistry (use of ultrasound in electrochemistry). This includes the development of new energy materials (storage of hydrogen, electrolyzer, fuel cells, batteries and supercapacitors); water treatment / disinfection; demonstrators and prototypes. He pioneered the use of ultrasound in the area of hydrogen science and technology. Since 1995, he has worked closely with the chemical engineer, Professor Jean-Yves Hihn (Marie and Louis Pasteur University) in the area of sonoelectrochemistry. In their 2007 paper in the Journal of the Electrochemical Society, they proposed an equation as a tool for sonoelectrochemical research, known as the "Pollet-Hihn equation". During his time in the UK, he worked for several companies that include Johnson Matthey on fuel cell components and testing. He also worked closely with the British physicist and Fellow of the Royal Society, Kevin Kendall who both co-founded the University of Birmingham Centre for Hydrogen and Fuel Cell Research. In 2010, together with Kevin Kendall FRS, he developed the first Master and PhD programmes with integrated studies in hydrogen, fuel cells and their applications under the £5.5m UK Engineering and Physical Sciences Research Council Doctoral Training Centre that included the University of Birmingham, the University of Loughborough and the University of Nottingham. He is a member of several international academic journals' editorial boards, e.g. the International Journal of Hydrogen Energy (Elsevier), Current Opinion in Electrochemistry (Elsevier), Hydrogen (MDPI), Transformative Energy and Johnson Matthey Technology Review (previously known as Platinum Metals Review). According to ResearchGate, Bruno G. Pollet has over 450 publications that include peer-reviewed articles, conference articles, book chapters and authored/edited books. According to Google Scholar, his works have been highly cited (more than 20,000 times), with an h-index of 73 as of November 2026. According to the prestigious list published by Stanford University and the Scopus database, which brings together 9 million scientists, Bruno G. Pollet is among the 2% of most cited research experts across the planet in 2021, 2022, 2023, 2024 and 2025. Bruno G. Pollet is often contacted by the media regarding his research work on hydrogen.

== Career ==
- Adjunct professor in Renewable Energy from August 2021 to July 2023 at the Department of Energy and Process Engineering, Norwegian University of Science and Technology (NTNU), Norway.
- Professor of Chemistry from August 2021 at the Hydrogen Research Institute (HRI), Université du Québec à Trois-Rivières, Canada.
- Leader of H2CAN 2.0, a cluster of hydrogen R&D groups in Canada.
- INNERGEX Industrial Research Chair holder in Renewable Hydrogen Production from January 2022 to June 2025.
- NSERC Tier 1 Canada Research Chair holder in Green Hydrogen Production from August 2021.
- President of the Green Hydrogen Division of the International Association for Hydrogen Energy (IAHE) from September 2020.
- Visiting Professor of Chemistry from June 2020 to July 2021 at the Hydrogen Research Institute (HRI), Université du Québec à Trois-Rivières, Canada.
- Visiting Professor of Hydrogen Energy from January 2019 to December 2021 at the South African Institute of Advanced Materials Chemistry, University of the Western Cape, South Africa.
- Leader of NTNU Energy Team Hydrogen from April 2019 to July 2021, Norway.
- Professor of renewable energy from May 2017 to July 2021 at the Department of Energy and Process Engineering, Norway.
- Professor of Energy Materials and Systems from March 2012 to March 2015 and Director of HySA (Hydrogen South Africa) Systems Integration & Technology Validation Competence Centre at the South African Institute of Advanced Materials Chemistry, University of the Western Cape, South Africa.
- Visiting Professor since March 2013 at the Hydrogen Safety Engineering and Research Centre, HySAFER, University of Ulster, UK.
- In 2018, he was a member of the founding group for the establishment of the lithium-ion battery gigafactory, FREYR Battery, Norway.
- In 2013, he was elected as a member of the Board of Directors of the International Association for Hydrogen Energy.
- Visiting Professor at the Fuel Cell Nanomaterials Centre, University of Yamanashi, Japan from 2010 to 2016.
- Independent Consultant, Eau2Energy (Energy and the Environment), UK
- Non-Executive Director & Chief Technology Officer, KP2M Ltd t/a Power and Water (P&W), UK
- Head of R&D Centre, Coldharbour Marine Ltd, UK
- Acting & associate R&D Director of the Centre for Hydrogen and Fuel Cell Research, The University of Birmingham, UK
- Operations & Delivery Director of the EPSRC Doctoral Training Centre in Hydrogen, Fuel Cells and their Applications, The University of Birmingham, UK
- Head of the Birmingham University PEMFC Research group, UK
- Lecturer in Chemical Engineering, The University of Birmingham, UK
- Research Fellow in Chemical Engineering, The University of Birmingham, UK
- EU Research Fellow/Head of Sono-Electrochemistry Group, Coventry University, UK
- Technical Account Manager, Samuel Banner Ltd (Banner Ltd), UK
- Key Area Account Manager, Albion Chemical Distribution Ltd, UK
- PEMFC Test Facility Engineer/Scientist, MEA Design Scientist & Programme Leader, Johnson Matthey Fuel Cells Ltd (Johnson Matthey Plc), UK
- Development Chemist/Research Manager, SmartWater Europe Ltd, R&T, UK
- F/T Lecturer in Environmental & Physical Sciences, Coventry University, UK
- P/T Lecturer in Applied Chemistry, Coventry University, UK
- EPSRC & EU Fellow, The University of Liverpool Electrochemistry Group, UK
- In 2010, he was elected as Fellow of the Royal Society of Chemistry (RSC), UK.
- In 2008, he was part of a team of engineers who made sure to put into operation the first hydrogen refuelling station in England.
- In 2007, he helped with the second generation of hydrogen and fuel cell cars - Microcab

== Peer-reviewed publications ==
- List of Bruno G. Pollet's publications in Google Scholar
- List of Bruno G. Pollet's publications in ResearchGate
- List of Bruno G. Pollet's publications in Scopus
- List of Bruno G. Pollet's publications in CRIStin

== Books ==
- 2012 - Power Ultrasound in Electrochemistry: From Versatile Laboratory Tool to Engineering Solution, Editor: Bruno G. Pollet, Wiley, ISBN 9780470974247
- 2016 - The Energy Landscape in the Republic of South Africa, Authors: Bruno G. Pollet, Iain Staffell, Kerry-Ann Adamson, Springer, ISBN 9783319255088
- 2016 - Recent Advances in High-Temperature PEM Fuel Cells, Authors: Sivakumar Pasupathi, Juan Carlos Calderon Gomez, Huaneng Su, Harikishan Reddy, Piotr Bujlo, Cordellia Sita, Bruno G. Pollet, Elsevier, ISBN 9780128099896
- 2017 - Hydrogen Electrochemical Production, Editor: Bruno G. Pollet, Elsevier, ISBN 9780128112502
- 2017 - One-dimensional Nanostructures for PEM Fuel Cell Applications, Editor: Bruno G. Pollet, Elsevier, ISBN 9780128111123
- 2018 - PEM Water Electrolysis, Vol.1, Editor: Bruno G. Pollet, Elsevier, ISBN 9780128111451
- 2018 - PEM Water Electrolysis, Vol.2, Editor: Bruno G. Pollet, Elsevier, ISBN 9780081028308
- 2018 - Organic Sonochemistry: Challenges and Perspectives for the 21st Century, Editors: Bruno G. Pollet, Muthupandian Ashokkumar, Springer, ISBN 9783319985541
- 2018 - Acoustic Cavitation and Bubble Dynamics, Editors: Bruno G. Pollet, Muthupandian Ashokkumar, Springer, ISBN 9783319682365
- 2018 - Ultrasonic Production of Nano-emulsions for Bioactive Delivery in Drug and Food Applications, Editors: Bruno G. Pollet, Muthupandian Ashokkumar, Springer, ISBN 9783319734903
- 2018 - Ultrasound Technology in Dairy Processing, Editors: Bruno G. Pollet, Muthupandian Ashokkumar, Springer, ISBN 9783319934815
- 2018 - Sonochemical Production of Nanomaterials, Editors: Bruno G. Pollet, Muthupandian Ashokkumar, Springer, ISBN 9783319967332
- 2019 - Characterization of Cavitation Bubbles and Sonoluminescence, Editors: Bruno G. Pollet, Muthupandian Ashokkumar, Springer, ISBN 9783030117160
- 2019 - Introduction to Ultrasound, Sonochemistry and Sonoelectrochemistry, Authors: Bruno G. Pollet, Muthupandian Ashokkumar, Springer, ISBN 9783030258610
- 2019 - Production of Clean Hydrogen by Electrochemical Reforming of Oxygenated Organic Compounds, Editor: Bruno G. Pollet, Elsevier, ISBN 9780128215012
- 2020 - Hydrogen, Biomass and Bioenergy - Integration Pathways for Renewable Energy Applications, Editors: Bruno G. Pollet, Jacob Joseph Lamb, Springer, ISBN 9780081026298
- 2020 - Micro-Optics and Energy - Sensors for Energy Devices, Editors: Jacob Joseph Lamb, Bruno G. Pollet, Springer, ISBN 9783030436766
- 2020 - Energy-smart Buildings - Design, Construction and Monitoring of Buildings for Improved Energy Efficiency, Editors: Jacob Joseph Lamb, Bruno G. Pollet, Springer, ISBN 9780750332590
