= Nanocapsule =

Nanoscale shell made from polymer

A nanocapsule is a nanoscale shell made from a nontoxic polymer. They are vesicular systems made of a polymeric membrane which encapsulates an inner liquid core at the nanoscale. Nanocapsules have many uses, including promising medical applications for drug delivery, food enhancement, nutraceuticals, and for self-healing materials. The benefits of encapsulation methods are for protection of these substances to protect in the adverse environment, for controlled release, and for precision targeting. Nanoencapsulation is the technique that uses nanocapsules to pack substances to be released in a controlled and effective way.

Nanocapsules can be made of various types of nanomaterials; the most common ones are liposomes, nanoparticles, micelles, nanospheres, nanoemulsions and nanocochleates. Nanocapsules can potentially be used as MRI-guided nanorobots or nanobots, although challenges remain.

IUPAC definition

Hollow nanoparticle composed of a solid shell that surrounds a core-forming
space available to entrap substances.

== Structure ==
The typical size of the nanocapsule used for various applications ranges from 10-1000 nm. However, depending on the preparation and use of the nanocapsule, the size will be more specific.

Nanocapsule structure consists of nanovesicular system that is formed in a core-shell arrangement. The shell of a typical nanocapsule is made of a polymeric membrane or coating. The type of polymers used is of biodegradable polyester, as nanocapsules are often used in biological systems. Poly-e-caprolactone (PCL), poly(lactide) (PLA), and poly(lactide-co-glicolide) (PLGA) are typical polymers used in nanocapsule formation. Other polymers include thiolated poly(methacrylic acid) and poly(N-vinyl Pyrrolidone). As synthetic polymers have proven to be more pure and reproducible when compared naturally occurring polymers, they are often preferred for the construction nanocapsules. However, some natural occurring polymers such as chitosan, gelatin, sodium alginate, and albumin are used in some drug delivering nanocapsules. Other nanocapsule shells include liposomes, along with polysaccharides and saccharides. Polysaccharides and saccharides are used due to their non-toxicity and biodegradability. They are attractive to use as they resemble biological membranes.

The core of a nanocapsule is composed of an oil surfactant that is specifically selected to coordinate with the selected drug within the polymeric membrane. The specific oil used must be highly soluble with the drug, and non-toxic when used in a biological environment. The oil-drug emulsion must have low solubility with the polymer membrane to ensure that the drug will be carried throughout the system properly and be released at the proper time and location. When the proper emulsion is obtained, the drug should be uniformly dispersed throughout the entire internal cavity of the polymeric membrane.

== Processing ==
The encapsulation method depends on the requirements for any given drug or substance. These processes depend on the physiochemical properties of the core material, the wall material, and the required size. The most common ways to produce nanocapsules are nanoprecipitation, emulsion-diffusion, and solvent-evaporation.

In the nanoprecipitation method, also termed solvent displacement method, nanocapsules are formed by creating a colloidal suspension between two separate phases. The organic phase consists of a solution and a mixture of organic solvents. The aqueous phase consists of a mixture of non-solvents that forms a surface film. The organic phase is slowly injected in the aqueous phase which then is agitated to form the colloidal suspension. Once the colloidal suspension is formed it will be agitated until nanocapsules begin to form. The size and shape of the nanocapsule depend on the rate of injection along with the rate of agitation.

Another common way to prepare nanocapsules is the emulsion diffusion method. This method consists of three phases: organic, aqueous, and dilution phase. In this method the organic phase is added to the aqueous phase under conditions of high agitation which form an emulsion. During this process water is added to the emulsion which causes the solvent to diffuse. The result of this emulsion-diffusion is nanocapsule formation.

Solvent evaporation is another effective method to prepare nanocapsules. In this process, single or double emulsions are formed from solvents and are used to formulate a nanoparticle suspension. High speed homogenization or ultrasonication is used to form small particle size in the nanoparticle suspension. Once the suspension is stable, the solvents are evaporated using either continuous magnetic stirring at room temperature, or by reducing the ambient pressure.

The table below displays how nanocapsules exhibit different traits based on the method by which they were prepared. Nanocapsule types vary by size, drug concentration, and active substance release time.

	Mean size (nm)	Drug concentration in diluted dispersion (mg/ml)	Drug concentration in concentrated dispersion (mg/ml)	Active substance release time (90%) (min)
Nanoprecipitation	250	0.002–0.09	0.15–6.5	750
Emulsion-diffusion	425	~0.2	50	60
Double emulsification	400	2–5	20–50	45
Emulsification coacervation	300	~0.24	12	>2000

=== Processing issues and solutions ===
Nanocapsules tend to aggregate and become unstable. Thus, substances within capsules can leak. To control the instability, nanocapsules can be dried either through spray drying or freeze-drying (lyophilization).

Spray drying – Solutions are sprayed into a drying medium. This method is more widely used in the food industry and used for encapsulation of many food products as flavors, minerals, colors, and vitamins. This method makes nanocapsules more stable, and increases shelf-life of foods.

Freeze-drying – This process involves dehydration of materials that are heat-sensitive. Unlike spray drying, water is removed through the sublimation process without changing the structure or shape of the nanoparticles. Freeze-drying involves four states: freezing, primary drying, secondary drying, and storage. Because of the multiple stages involved, this method is considered to demand more energy and time.

== Properties ==
=== Absorbability ===
Aspect ratio affects the ability of the nanocapsule to penetrate tumor cells. Low aspect ratios (spherical capsules) tend to penetrate cells more easily than high aspect ratios (rod-shaped capsules).

=== Structure ===
The nano-sized structure of nanocapsules allows permeating through basal membranes, which makes them effective carriers of medicine in biological systems. The specific processing of nanocapsules gives them unique properties in how they release drugs in certain situations. Generally, there are three physico-chemical release mechanisms that are used to release the drug or medicine from the polymeric shell of the nanocapsule.

==== Delivery ====
1. Hydration and diffusion – In this release mechanism the nanocapsule will swell due to the effects of hydration. Once the nanocapsule has swollen to a point where it stretches, the polymeric membrane will allow for diffusion of the drug through the polymeric membrane and into the biological system.
2. Enzymatic reaction – The polymer shell must be first selected to coordinate with the enzymes produced by the human body to produce and enzymatic reaction. This reaction will cause a rupture in the polymeric membrane which allows the drug to be dispersed into the system.
3. Dissociation of the drug – The drug dissociates from the swelled nanocapsule and diffuses out into the rest of the cell.

===== Other delivery methods: substance delivery in medical use =====
Near-infrared light: Drug release is triggered from heat. The infrared technology can be absorbed deep in the body, turn to heat. The heat-sensitive material, particularly a polymer shell that swells upon heating, collapses. The action of deflating is what releases the drug.

Magnetic fields: Magnetic bars of millimeter-scale are embedded in poly(vinyl alcohol). The magnetic field within the bars is alternated, which results in the change of shape and ultimate collapse of the nanocapsules. The change in the structure then triggers the drug release.

Ultrasound: Another option of drug release is through ultrasound, which is a "longitudinal pressure wave". The ultrasound can either be low-frequency, or LFUS, (between ~20 and ~100 kHz) or high-frequency, HFUS, (>1 MHz). Transdermal delivery (sonophoresis) is enhanced through LFUS, which then further allows the drug to be released. Since the wave of HFUS is higher, success of drug delivery has been demonstrated through the form of bubbles. The bubbles with in the capsule are formed and collapsed due to the higher temperatures of the wave.

Some other ways include oral, which is the most active, nasal, transdermal, and through the lung. Oral is the most common, and the most challenging. Demands for consistent release persist, although developments are being made for drugs to bioadhere to the intestinal tract. Bioadhesion is also being considered for nasal delivery, to prolong the life of the drug within the nose. Drugs can also be transferred through the skin (transdermal). Inhalers are also of interest, as for example, asthma drugs consist of macromolecules. Currently, the inhalation systems are undesirable to patients, and it is hoped that there will be advances in this delivery system at some time.

== Applications ==
=== Cancer ===
Water-soluble polymer shells are being created to deliver a protein, apoptin, into cancer cells. The protein goes into the nucleus of the cancer cells while leaving healthy cells alone, unlike other conventional therapies as gene therapies and chemotherapy. The capsules are 100 nm in size.

Active targeting of cancer cells is also being researched. Through active targeting, the nanocapsules form ligands that bind to malignant cells for cell delivery. This method is especially beneficial for those drugs that are not as permeable through the cell membrane, and where tissues are diseased, the nanoparticles are able to bond easier with the malignant cells.

=== Food usage ===
Nanoencapuslation in foods involves the changing of textures, flavorings, colorings, and stability in shelf-life.

==== Nutraceuticals ====
Nutraceuticals (from nutrient + pharmaceutical) are substances that are placed in food to enhance nutrition. The increased bioavailability of these substances is relative to the size of the nanocarrier. The smaller the nanocarrier, the better the delivery properties and the solubility of the nutraceuticals; the nanocarrier is able to enter the bloodstream easier if smaller.

Lipid or polymer-based (natural biodegradable) are used for encapsulation for nutraceuticals. Types of polymers used include collagen, gelatin, and albumin.

==== Ethyl alcohol absorption ====
Relatively new research involves the encapsulation of digestive enzymes within a non-toxic polymer shell. The enzyme filled nanoshell has been proven in lab mice to absorb ethyl alcohol from the bloodstream, therefore resulting in reduced blood alcohol levels. It has been concluded that the particles act as organelles, which proposes other benefits to enzyme therapies. This discovery is introducing other studies, such as encapsulation methods for hair loss.

=== Self-healing materials ===
For materials such as components in microelectronics, polymeric coatings, and adhesives, nanocapsules can reduce damage caused by high loads. The healing of cracks within these materials is alleviated by dispersing nanocapsules within the polymer. The healing substances include dicyclopentadiene (DCPD), which is prepared on site within the material by sonication. The nanoencapsulated material is first emulsified within the host material by creating an oil-in-water self-healing epoxy. The emulsified material is then agitated within the host material to form particles which then bond to the host material.

=== Concerns of use ===
As of 2016, it is unknown what the impacts of nano-sized materials are to human health and the environment. It is only via chemical risk and toxic assessments over time can affirm any effects. The measures for testing are currently insufficient, and the approval for the use of nanoparticles, especially in food, is ambiguous.
