= Turhan Nejat Veziroğlu =

Turkish-American academic and pioneer in hydrogen energy (1924–2024)

- Veziroğlu in 2018
- Born: Turhan Nejat Veziroğlu; January 24, 1924; Istanbul, Turkey
- Died: September 5, 2024 (aged 100); Miami, Florida, U.S.
- Education: Pertevniyal High School
- Alma mater: University of London (BS, PhD); Imperial College of Science and Technology (DIC)
- Occupations: Academic; mechanical engineer; research director; author
- Known for: Pioneer in hydrogen energy Founding editor, International Journal of Hydrogen Energy; Initiator of the World Hydrogen Energy Conference
- Awards: Turkish Presidential Science Award (1975); Kurchatov Medal (1982); Nobel Prize nominee (2000)
- Website: www.iahe.org

Turhan Nejat Veziroğlu (24 January 1924 – 5 September 2024), also known as T. N. Veziroğlu, was a Turkish-American academic and mechanical engineer. He was a professor emeritus at the University of Miami, where he chaired its mechanical engineering department in the 1970s and served as its associate dean for research. A key figure in the advocacy for the hydrogen economy, he was the President of the International Association for Hydrogen Energy and founding editor of the International Journal of Hydrogen Energy. A research center at the University of Niğde, Turkey, is named after him. He was nominated for the Nobel Prize in Economics in 2000 for his work on the hydrogen economy.

== Early life and education ==
Veziroğlu was born and raised in Istanbul, Turkey, where he attended elementary and middle school in İzmir, then attended Pertevniyal High School in Istanbul. After attending Istanbul Technical University for one and a half years, he became a student in England during World War II, receiving a B.Sc. from University of London in 1946, along with an ACGI in mechanical engineering in London that same year. In 1947, he received the DIC in engineering and technology from the Imperial College of Science and Technology in London. In 1951, Veziroğlu wrote his PhD dissertation at the University of London.

Veziroğlu returned to Turkey after graduating, joining the Turkish military for compulsory military service, in the ordnance section, inventions examiner, from 1952 to 1953. He worked as an engineer and scientific advisor for the Office of Soil Products in Ankara from 1954 to 1956, including as Deputy Director of Steel Silos. He spent a summer working on nuclear engineering at the Electric Power Research Institute in Ankara during 1956. He was an engineering consultant in Istanbul during 1957 and 1958, then worked in his family's business, Veziroğlu Construction Company, as technical director from 1959 to 1961.

== Work ==
In 1962, Veziroğlu became an associate professor at the University of Miami in Coral Gables, Florida, becoming full professor of mechanical engineering there in 1966, retaining that title through 2009, when he became professor emeritus. He was made a full member of their research faculty in 1969, serving as Director of Graduate Studies from 1965 to 1971, and as chairman of the department of Mechanical Engineering from 1971 through 1975.

Veziroğlu created the first engineering Ph.D program at the university, and in 1974 was organizer of an early conference on hydrogen energy.

He then accepted a visiting professorship to the Middle East Technical University. In 1973, shortly after the energy crisis, Veziroğlu established the Clean Energy Research Institute within the university, and was its director from 1974 onward. He organized a conference on hydrogen energy in 1974. (Note: THEME Conference: The Hydrogen Economy Miami Energy Conference, Miami Beach, 18–20 March 1974; proceedings were published by University of Miami Press) He became associate dean for research in 1975, and maintained that role through 1979. He was a visiting lecturer at Xi'an Jiatong University during the summer of 1980, and a visiting lecturer at the Atomic Research Laboratories in Argentina during the summer of 1985.

As a researcher in hydrogen energy and two-phase flows, Veziroğlu has co-authored over 300 scientific papers, and was a founding editor of the International Journal of Hydrogen Energy. Veziroğlu was also named honorary editor-in-chief of Engineering Science and Technology, The International Journal of Sciences and Engineering: Research and Applications, and International Scientific Journal for Alternative Energy and Ecology.

In his seventies, Veziroğlu took a leave of absence from the University of Miami, becoming founding director of International Centre for Hydrogen Energy Technologies. (Note: United Nations Industrial Development Organization, International Centre for Hydrogen Energy Technologies.) He returned to his professorship in 2007, and on May 15, 2009 became professor emeritus. In 2010, the 10th International Conference on Clean Energy was dedicated to his work.

He was founding editor of the International Journal of Hydrogen Energy and founder of Hydrogen Energy Publications LLC. He was president of the International Association for Hydrogen Energy, initiator of the World Hydrogen Energy Conference, and initiator of the World Hydrogen Technology Convention.

== Personal life ==
Married since 2006 to Ayfer Kale; the couple has one daughter, Lili Ferruh. Veziroğlu was vice president and advisor of hydrogen development for fuel cells at Apollo Energy Systems. Veziroğlu has been a board member of the Learning Disabilities Foundation since 1970. In 2013, Veziroğlu and his family donated money to the University of Miami to establish a named professorship.

== Honors ==
- Chair, Commission on Energy, World Constitution and Parliament Association (WCPA)
- Turkish Presidential Science Award, 1975
- Medal of the City of Paris, Paris, France, 1977
- Kurchatov Medal from the Kurchatov Institute of Atomic Energy, Moscow, USSR, 1982
- Science Award, Academy of Television Arts & Sciences, January 1995

=== Honorary degrees ===
- Honorary doctorate from Anadolu University in Eskişehir, Turkey, October 1998.
- Honorary doctorate from the Donetsk State Technical University in the Ukraine, March 2001.
- Honorary professorship, Ministry of Education, People's Republic of China, 1981.

== Selected publications ==
- 1996, "Performance analysis of photovoltaic thermal air heaters," Yigit, Liu, Kakac, Veziroğlu & etc., Elsevier.
- 2001, "From hydrogen economy to hydrogen civilization," VA Goltsov, TN Veziroğlu, International Journal of Hydrogen Energy.
- 2002, "Current status of hydrogen energy," M Momirlan, TN Veziroğlu, Renewable and Sustainable Energy Reviews, Elsevier.
- 2004, "A review of hydrogen storage systems based on boron and its compounds," E Fakioğlu, Y Yürüm, TN Veziroğlu, Elsevier.
- 2005, "Wind energy and the hydrogen economy — review of the technology,"' SA Sherif, F Barbir, TN Veziroğlu, Solar Energy, Vol. 78, No. 5, pp. 647–660.
- 2008, "Advances in biological hydrogen production processes," D Das, TN Veziroğlu, International Journal of Hydrogen Energy.
