= Nanoengineering =

Engineering on the nanoscale

Nanoengineering is the practice of engineering on the nanoscale. It derives its name from the nanometre, a unit of measurement equalling one billionth of a meter.

Nanoengineering is a near-synonym for nanoscience, but the latter emphasizes the engineering rather than the pure science aspects of the field. Furthermore, it is a near-synonym of nanotechnology, which indicates all the nanoscale technologies produced as the final output.

== History ==
- 4th Century Rome: The Lycurgus Cup was crafted using dichroic glass which is a product of nanoengineering
- 6th-15th Centuries: Stained glass windows were created in European cathedrals which contained nanoparticles of gold chloride or other metal oxides or chlorides. These nanoparticles give the glass its vibrant colors.
- 9th-17th Centuries: A sparkling layer on the outside of ceramics was used containing silver, copper, or other metallic nanoparticles.
- 13th-18th Centuries: "Damascus" saber blades were crafted using techniques that resulted in nanotubes and cementite nanowires.
- 1950: Victor La Mer and Robert Dinegar created a process that was used to create specialized papers, paints, and thin films on an industrial level by growing monodisperse colloidal materials.
- 1959: Richard Feynman gave the first lecture on molecular technology and engineering or just nanoengineering.
- 1981: Gerd Binnig and Heinrich Rohrer invented the first atomic level microscope called a scanning tunneling microscope that allowed scientists to see individual atoms
- 1991: The carbon nanotube was discovered by Sumio Iijima which became important due to their strength, and electrical and thermal conductivity
- 2004: SUNY Albany started the first college program that focused on nanoengineering in the United States. It was called the College of Nanoscale Science and Engineering
- 2009-2010: Robotic nanoscale assembly devices were created by Nadrian Seeman and his colleagues. These devices would be used to create 3D DNA structures using DNA crystals

== Degree programs ==
The first nanoengineering program was started at the University of Toronto within the Engineering Science program as one of the options of study in the final years. In 2003, the Lund Institute of Technology started a program in Nanoengineering. In 2004, the College of Nanoscale Science and Engineering at the University at Albany, SUNY was founded as the first of its kind in the United States. The college later merged with SUNY Poly, but will rejoin the University at Albany in 2023. In 2005, the University of Waterloo established a unique program which offers a full degree in Nanotechnology Engineering. Louisiana Tech University started the first program in the U.S. in 2005. In 2006 the University of Duisburg-Essen started a Bachelor and a Master program NanoEngineering. Unlike early NanoEngineering programs, the first NanoEngineering Department in the world, offering both undergraduate and graduate degrees, was established by the University of California, San Diego in 2007. In 2009, the University of Toronto began offering all Options of study in Engineering Science as degrees, bringing the second nanoengineering degree to Canada. Rice University established in 2016 a Department of Materials Science and NanoEngineering (MSNE). DTU Nanotech - the Department of Micro- and Nanotechnology - is a department at the Technical University of Denmark established in 1990.

In 2013, Wayne State University began offering a Nanoengineering Undergraduate Certificate Program, which is funded by a Nanoengineering Undergraduate Education (NUE) grant from the National Science Foundation. The primary goal is to offer specialized undergraduate training in nanotechnology. Other goals are: 1) to teach emerging technologies at the undergraduate level, 2) to train a new adaptive workforce, and 3) to retrain working engineers and professionals.

== Techniques ==
- Scanning tunneling microscope (STM) - Can be used to both image, and to manipulate structures as small as a single atom.
- Molecular self-assembly - Arbitrary sequences of DNA can now be synthesized cheaply in bulk, and used to create custom proteins or regular patterns of amino acids. Similarly, DNA strands can bind to other DNA strands, allowing simple structures to be created.
- Nanoencapsulation - The use of nanostructures to pack materials to be released in a controlled and effective way. Nanoencapsulation is combined with other techniques such as nanoemulsification and nano-structuration and nanomaterials used as nanocapsules; the most common are liposomes, nanoparticles, micelles, nanospheres, nanoemulsions and nanocochleates. Nanoencapsulation can be applied to the fields of nanopharmacology, drug delivery in the nanoscale, nutraceuticals, and food industry.

== See also ==
- List of nanoengineering topics
- Nanotechnology
- Picoengineering
- Molecular engineering
