= French press (disambiguation) =

A French press, also known as a press pot, coffee press, coffee plunger, cafetière or cafetière à piston, is a simple coffee brewing device.

French press may also refer to:

- French pressure cell press, apparatus used in biological experimentation to disrupt the plasma membrane of cells
- Lying triceps extensions, also known as French presses, a strength exercise used in many different forms of weight lifting
- The French newspaper industry; see Media of France#Newspapers
- Melior (typeface), a font
