= International Association for Hydrogen Energy =

Hydrogen, Science, Engineering, Society, Association, Scholars

- Clean and Abundant Energy for Sustainability
- Formation: 1974; 52 years ago
- Type: Scientific society
- Legal status: nonprofit organization
- Headquarters: Miami, Florida
- Location: United States
- Members: >1,000
- Key people: Ayfer Veziroğlu (President); Bruno Georges Pollet (Executive VP); Frano Barbir (Executive VP); Giuseppe Spazzafumo (Executive VP)
- Website: iahe.org

The International Association for Hydrogen Energy (IAHE) is a learned society and professional association based in the United States that supports scientific, technology and engineering inquiries in the field of hydrogen science and technology. The IAHE was founded in 1974 by Turhan Nejat Veziroğlu and other scholars such as John Bockris who coined the term hydrogen economy. The IAHE membership comprises over 1,000 scientists, technologists and engineers in over 110 countries at all degree levels and in all fields of hydrogen and related technologies.

The IAHE is a non-profit organization.

International Journal of Hydrogen Energy is an official journal of the IAHE. HEPLLC is the publisher, and Elsevier is the publishing house. The IJHE on Elsevier encompasses over 200,000 peer-reviewed papers since its creation in 1976.

The IAHE has nine topic interest area divisions namely, the IAHE Biohydrogen Division, the IAHE Codes and Standards Division, the IAHE Fuel Cell Division, the IAHE Green Hydrogen Division, the IAHE Hydrogen Energy Systems Division, the IAHE Hydrogen Safety Division, the IAHE Hydrogen Storage Division, the IAHE Nuclear Hydrogen Division and the IAHE Young Scientists Division from different regions of the world sections. Over seventeen IAHE student chapters are located in major universities in Peru, Mexico, Egypt, Turkey, India, UK, USA, China, and Armenia, Europe.

The IAHE founded the World Hydrogen Energy Conference (WHEC) in 1976 and the World Hydrogen Technologies Convention (WHTC) in 2005 to provide a platform for the Hydrogen Energy community, including scientists, engineers, technologists, environmentalists, decision-makers, policy-makers, industrialists and visionaries.

== History ==
The first international conference on Hydrogen Energy was held on 18–20 March 1974 in Miami, United States. One of IAHE's first activities was organizing the World Hydrogen Energy Conferences (WHEC) to provide a platform for hydrogen energy experts, environmentalists, and decision-makers. The plan was to meet every two years, with the first WHEC Conference held in Miami Beach in 1976. Meanwhile, the eleven founding members of IAHE, including Cesare Marchetti, John O'M Bockris, Tokio Ohta, William D. Van Vorst, Anibal R. Martinez, Walter Seifritz, Hussein K. Abdel-Aal, William J.D.D. Escher, Robert Zweig, Kurt H. Weil, and Turhan Nejat Veziroğlu became known as the “Hydrogen Romantics”, agreeing that the hydrogen energy system was the solution to fuel depletion and global environmental problems.

== Conferences ==
History of conferences and conventions
Year	Location	Number	Type
2027	Canada, Halifax	12th	WHTC
2026	Singapore, Singapore	25th	WHEC
2025	Ireland, Dublin	11th	WHTC
2024	Mexico, Cancún	24th	WHEC
2023	China, Foshan	10th	WHTC
2022	Turkey, Istanbul	23rd	WHEC
2021	Canada, Montreal	9th	WHTC
2019	Japan, Tokyo	8th	WHTC
2018	Brazil, Rio de Janeiro	22nd	WHEC
2017	Czech Republic, Prague	7th	WHTC
2016	Spain, Zaragoza	21st	WHEC
2015	Australia, Sydney	6th	WHTC
2014	South Korea, Gwangju	20th	WHEC
2013	China, Shanghai	5th	WHTC
2012	Canada, Toronto	19th	WHEC
2011	Scotland, Glasgow	4th	WHTC
2010	Germany, Essen	18th	WHEC
2009	India, Delhi	3rd	WHTC
2008	Australia, Brisbane	17th	WHEC
2007	Italy, Montecatini Terme	2nd	WHTC
2006	France, Lyon	16th	WHEC
2005	Singapore, Singapore	1st	WHTC
2004	Japan, Yokohama	15th	WHEC
2002	Canada, Montreal	14th	WHEC
2000	China, Beijing	13th	WHEC
1998	Argentina, Buenos Aires	12th	WHEC
1996	Germany, Stuttgart	11th	WHEC
1994	United States, Cocoa Beach	10th	WHEC
1992	France, Paris	9th	WHEC
1990	United States, Honolulu	8th	WHEC
1988	Russia, Moscow	7th	WHEC
1986	Austria, Vienna	6th	WHEC
1984	Canada, Toronto	5th	WHEC
1982	United States, Pasadena	4th	WHEC
1980	Japan, Tokyo	3rd	WHEC
1978	Switzerland, Zurich	2nd	WHEC
1976	United States, Miami Beach	1st	WHEC
1974	United States, Miami Beach	Theme Conference	WHEC

== Journal ==
International Journal of Hydrogen Energy is an official journal of the IAHE. HEPLLC is the publisher, and Elsevier is the publishing house. The IJHE on Elsevier encompasses over 200,000 peer-reviewed papers since its creation in 1976.

IJHE top cited articles are:

- A review on hydrogen production and utilization: Challenges and opportunities Haris Ishaq, Curran Crawford International Journal of Hydrogen Energy, 22 July 2022
- Green synthesis of DyBa2Fe3O7.988/DyFeO3 nanocomposites using almond extract with dual eco-friendly applications: Photocatalytic and antibacterial activities Makarim A. Mahdi, Masoud Salavati-Niasari International Journal of Hydrogen Energy, 12 April 2022
- An overview: Current progress on hydrogen fuel cell vehicles M.A. Aminudin, N. Snook International Journal of Hydrogen Energy, 5 February 2023
- A critical review on the current technologies for the generation, storage, and transportation of hydrogen Omar Fage, Ubong Eduok International Journal of Hydrogen Energy, 5 April 2022
- The economics and the environmental benignity of different colors of hydrogen A. Ajanović, R. Haas International Journal of Hydrogen Energy, 5 July 2022
- Hydrogen production through renewable and non-renewable energy processes and their impact on climate change Muhammad Amin, Chaeheon Lee International Journal of Hydrogen Energy, 8 September 2022
- Global hydrogen development - A technological and geopolitical overview B.E. Lebrouhi, T. Kousksou International Journal of Hydrogen Energy, 5 February 2022
- Hydrogen energy storage integrated hybrid renewable energy systems: A review analysis for future research directions A.Z. Arsad, F. Blaabjerg International Journal of Hydrogen Energy, 5 May 2022

== Educational Activities and Programs ==
The IAHE offers various educational activities and programs in several universities worldwide.

== Awards and Fellowships ==
The IAHE recognizes members for outstanding technical achievement in hydrogen science and engineering at various career levels, and recognizes exceptional service to the association, through the IAHE Fellowships and sponsorships - the international awards, medals, and prizes administered by the IAHE.

- IAHE Sir William Grove Award for Leadership in Electrochemical Area
  - 1998 - Ballard Power Systems, Canada
  - 2000 - Stanford R. Ovshinsky, U.S.A., DaimlerChrysler Corporation, Germany/U.S.A., and Ford Motor Company, U.S.A.
  - 2002 - UTC Fuel Cells, U.S.A.
  - 2004 - Toyota Motor Corporation, Japan, Honda Motor Company Ltd., Japan and General Motors Corporation, U.S.A.
  - 2006 - Milan M. Jaksic, Serbia
  - 2008 - Janusz Nowotny, Australia and Gang Wan, China
  - 2010 - Mazda Motor Corporation, Japan
  - 2012 - Fuel Cell Commercialization Conference of Japan, Japan; Hydrogenics Corporation, Canada; Shanghai Automotive Industry Corporation Group, China and Dieter Zetsche, Germany
  - 2014 - Detlef Stolten, Germany and Erich D. Wachsman, USA
  - 2016 - Deborah Jones, France and Adam Z. Weber, U.S.A.
  - 2018 - Peter Strasser, Germany and CRRC Qingdao Sifang Co., Ltd., China
  - 2022 - Bruno Georges Pollet, Canada
- IAHE Akira Mitsui Award for Leadership in Biological Area
  - 2002 - Jun Miyake, Japan
  - 2004 - Peter Lindblad, Sweden
  - 2008 - Debabrata Das, India
  - 2016 - Armen Trchounian, Armenia
  - 2022 - Takeshi Morikawa, Japan
- IAHE Jules Verne Award for Superior Service (a general area of involvement)
  - 1998 - John O'M. Bockris, U.S.A. and Cesare Marchetti, Austria
  - 2000 - Tokio Ohta, Japan and Robert M. Zweig, U.S.A.
  - 2002 - William D. Van Vorst, U.S.A. and Mylopore V.C. Sastri, India
  - 2004 - Bragi Arnason, Iceland and Carl-Jochen Winter, Germany
  - 2006 - Zong Qiang Mao, China and David Sanborn Scott, Canada
  - 2008 - U.S. DoE Hydrogen Program, U.S.A. and Ludwig-Bölkow-Systemtechnik GmbH, Germany
  - 2010 - C. E. (Sandy) Thomas, U.S.A.
  - 2012 - Alexander (Sandy) K. Stuart, Canada and Tom Sullivan, U.S.A.
  - 2014 - Chiyoda Corporation, Japan and Hyundai Motor Company, South Korea
  - 2016 - Hydrogen Energy Systems Society (HESS), Japan International Scientific Journal and Ecology (ISJAEE), Russia
  - 2018 - Nazim Muradov, Azerbaijan & U.S.A.; Andrei V. Tchouvelev, Canada; Toshiba Energy Systems & Solutions Corporation, Japan
  - 2022 - Giuseppe Spazzafumo, Italy
- IAHE Rudolph A. Erren Award for Leadership in Thermochemical Area
  - 1998 - World Energy NETwork (WE-NET) Project, MITI, Japan
  - 2000 - Victor A. Goltsov, Ukraine and Vladimir D. Rusanov, Russia
  - 2002 - BMW A.G., Germany
  - 2004 - Royal Dutch/Shell Group, Netherlands
  - 2006 - Linde A.G., Germany and Stoichi Fruhama, Japan
  - 2008 - The Japan Steel Works, Ltd., Japan and M.A.N. AG, Germany
  - 2010 - Hydrogen Network of North Rhine Westphalia - Dr. Andreas Ziolek, Germany
  - 2012 - Ravinder Kumar Malhotra, India
  - 2014 - Shanxi Provincial Guoxin Energy Development Group Co. Ltd (GXED), China
  - 2018 - Donald L. Anton, U.S.A. and Giuseppe Spazzafumo, Italy
  - 2022 - Yun Hang Hu, U.S.A.
- IAHE Konstantin Tsiolkovsky Award for Leadership in Aerospace Area
  - 1998 - National Aeronautics and Space Administration (NASA), U.S.A.
  - 2000 - Aerospatiele Matra, France
  - 2004 - Airbus S.A.S., E.U.
  - 2006 - ROSCOSMOS, Russian Federal Space Agency, Russia and Iwatani International Industry Co. Ltd., Japan
  - 2008 - Aerovironment Inc., U.S.A.
  - 2022 - Hiroaki Kobayashi, Japan
