= Ferric stearate =

Names
- Preferred IUPAC name Iron(III) stearate
- Systematic IUPAC name Iron(III) octadecanoate
- Other names: Iron(III) stearate; Iron tristearate; Ferric stearate; Iron(3+) octadecanoate

Identifiers
CAS Number	555-36-2
3D model (JSmol)	Interactive image
ChemSpider	61674
ECHA InfoCard	100.008.269
EC Number	225-889-4
PubChem CID	68388
UNII	E8Q7454COW
CompTox Dashboard (EPA)	80890507
- InChI: InChI=1S/3C18H36O2.Fe/c3*1-2-3-4-5-6-7-8-9-10-11-12-13-14-15-16-17-18(19)20;/h3*2-17H2,1H3,(H,19,20);/q;;;+3/p-3 Key: XHQSLVIGPHXVAK-UHFFFAOYSA-K
- SMILES: CCCCCCCCCCCCCCCCCC(=O)[O-].CCCCCCCCCCCCCCCCCC(=O)[O-].CCCCCCCCCCCCCCCCCC(=O)[O-].[Fe+3]

Properties
Chemical formula	C_{54}H_{105}FeO_{6}
Molar mass	906.273 g·mol^{−1}
Appearance	orange-red powder
Melting point	84 °C (183 °F; 357 K)
Boiling point	359.4 °C (678.9 °F; 632.5 K)
Solubility in water	insoluble
Solubility	soluble in hot ethanol, toluene, chloroform, acetone, benzene, turpentine
- Except where otherwise noted, data are given for materials in their standard state (at 25 °C [77 °F], 100 kPa). Infobox references

Ferric stearate or Iron(III) stearate is a metal-organic compound, a salt of iron and stearic acid with the chemical formula Fe(C_{17}H_{35}COO)_{3}. The compound is classified as a metallic soap, i.e. a metal derivative of a fatty acid. It forms an orange-red or brown hygroscopic powder.

== Synthesis ==
Iron(III) stearate can be prepared by reacting stearic acid with iron oxide.

It can also be prepared by treating stearic acid with iron chloride in presence of DABCO.

== Uses ==
The compound is used as a catalyst in organic synthesis, a reagent in analytical chemistry, and a stabilizer in biochemistry.
