= Sonochemistry =

Ultrasound effects on chemical activity

In chemistry, the study of sonochemistry is concerned with understanding the effect of ultrasound in forming acoustic cavitation in liquids, resulting in the initiation or enhancement of the chemical activity in the solution. Therefore, the chemical effects of ultrasound do not come from a direct interaction of the ultrasonic sound wave with the molecules in the solution.

== History ==
The influence of sonic waves travelling through liquids was first reported by Robert Williams Wood (1868–1955) and Alfred Lee Loomis (1887–1975) in 1927. The experiment was about the frequency of the energy that it took for sonic waves to "penetrate" the barrier of water. He came to the conclusion that sound does travel faster in water, but because of the water's density compared to Earth's atmosphere it was incredibly hard to get the sonic waves to couple their energy into the water. Due to the sudden density change, much of the energy is lost, similar to shining a flashlight towards a piece of glass; some of the light is transmitted into the glass, but much of it is lost to reflection outwards. Similarly with an air-water interface, almost all of the sound is reflected off the water, instead of being transmitted into it. After much research they decided that the best way to disperse sound into the water was to create bubbles at the same time as the sound. Another issue was the ratio of the amount of time it took for the lower frequency waves to penetrate the bubbles walls and access the water around the bubble, compared to the time from that point to the point on the other end of the body of water. But despite the revolutionary ideas of this article it was left mostly unnoticed. Sonochemistry experienced a renaissance in the 1980s with the advent of inexpensive and reliable generators of high-intensity ultrasound, most based around piezoelectric elements.

== Physical principles ==
Sound waves propagating through a liquid at ultrasonic frequencies have wavelengths many times longer than the molecular dimensions or the bond length between atoms in the molecule. Therefore, the sound wave cannot directly affect the vibrational energy of the bond, and can therefore not directly increase the internal energy of a molecule. Instead, sonochemistry arises from acoustic cavitation: the formation, growth, and implosive collapse of bubbles in a liquid. The collapse of these bubbles is an almost adiabatic process, thereby resulting in the massive build-up of energy inside the bubble, resulting in extremely high temperatures and pressures in a microscopic region of the sonicated liquid. The high temperatures and pressures result in the chemical excitation of any matter within or very near the bubble as it rapidly implodes. A broad variety of outcomes can result from acoustic cavitation including sonoluminescence, increased chemical activity in the solution due to the formation of primary and secondary radical reactions, and increased chemical activity through the formation of new, relatively stable chemical species that can diffuse further into the solution to create chemical effects (for example, the formation of hydrogen peroxide from the combination of two hydroxyl radicals following the dissociation of water vapor within collapsing bubbles when water is exposed to ultrasound).

Upon irradiation with high intensity sound or ultrasound, acoustic cavitation usually occurs. Cavitation – the formation, growth, and implosive collapse of bubbles irradiated with sound — is the impetus for sonochemistry and sonoluminescence. Bubble collapse in liquids produces enormous amounts of energy from the conversion of kinetic energy of the liquid motion into heating the contents of the bubble. The compression of the bubbles during cavitation is more rapid than thermal transport, which generates a short-lived localized hot-spot. Experimental results have shown that these bubbles have temperatures around 5000 K, pressures of roughly 1000 atm, and heating and cooling rates above 10^{10} K/s. These cavitations can create extreme physical and chemical conditions in otherwise cold liquids.

With liquids containing solids, similar phenomena may occur with exposure to ultrasound. Once cavitation occurs near an extended solid surface, cavity collapse is nonspherical and drives high-speed jets of liquid to the surface. These jets and associated shock waves can damage the now highly heated surface. Liquid-powder suspensions produce high velocity interparticle collisions. These collisions can change the surface morphology, composition, and reactivity.

== Sonochemical reactions ==
Three classes of sonochemical reactions exist: homogeneous sonochemistry of liquids, heterogeneous sonochemistry of liquid-liquid or solid–liquid systems, and, overlapping with the aforementioned, sonocatalysis (the catalysis or increasing the rate of a chemical reaction with ultrasound). Sonoluminescence is a consequence of the same cavitation phenomena that are responsible for homogeneous sonochemistry. The chemical enhancement of reactions by ultrasound has been explored and has beneficial applications in mixed phase synthesis, materials chemistry, and biomedical uses. Because cavitation can only occur in liquids, chemical reactions are not seen in the ultrasonic irradiation of solids or solid–gas systems.

For example, in chemical kinetics, it has been observed that ultrasound can greatly enhance chemical reactivity in a number of systems by as much as a million-fold; effectively acting to activate heterogeneous catalysts. In addition, in reactions at liquid-solid interfaces, ultrasound breaks up the solid pieces and exposes active clean surfaces through microjet pitting from cavitation near the surfaces and from fragmentation of solids by cavitation collapse nearby. This gives the solid reactant a larger surface area of active surfaces for the reaction to proceed over, increasing the observed rate of reaction.

While the application of ultrasound often generates mixtures of products, a paper published in 2007 in the journal Nature described the use of ultrasound to selectively affect a certain cyclobutane ring-opening reaction. Atul Kumar has reported multicomponent reaction Hantzsch ester synthesis in Aqueous Micelles using ultrasound.

Some water pollutants, especially chlorinated organic compounds, can be destroyed sonochemically.

Sonochemistry can be performed by using a bath (usually used for ultrasonic cleaning) or with a high power probe, called an ultrasonic horn, which funnels and couples a piezoelectric element's energy into the water, concentrated at one (typically small) point.

Sonochemistry can also be used to weld metals which are not normally feasible to join, or form novel alloys on a metal surface. This is distantly related to the method of calibrating ultrasonic cleaners using a sheet of aluminium foil and counting the holes. The holes formed are a result of microjet pitting resulting from cavitation near the surface, as mentioned previously. Due to the aluminium foil's thinness and weakness, the cavitation quickly results in fragmentation and destruction of the foil.

A new generation of sonochemistry is harnessing the advantages of functional, ferroelectric materials, to further enhance chemistry in a sonochemical reactor in an emerging process called piezocatalysis.

== See also ==
- Ultrasound
- Sonication
- Ultrasonics
- ultrasonic homogenizer
- homogenizer
- Homogenization (chemistry)
- Sonoelectrochemistry
- Kenneth S. Suslick
