= Cell disruption =

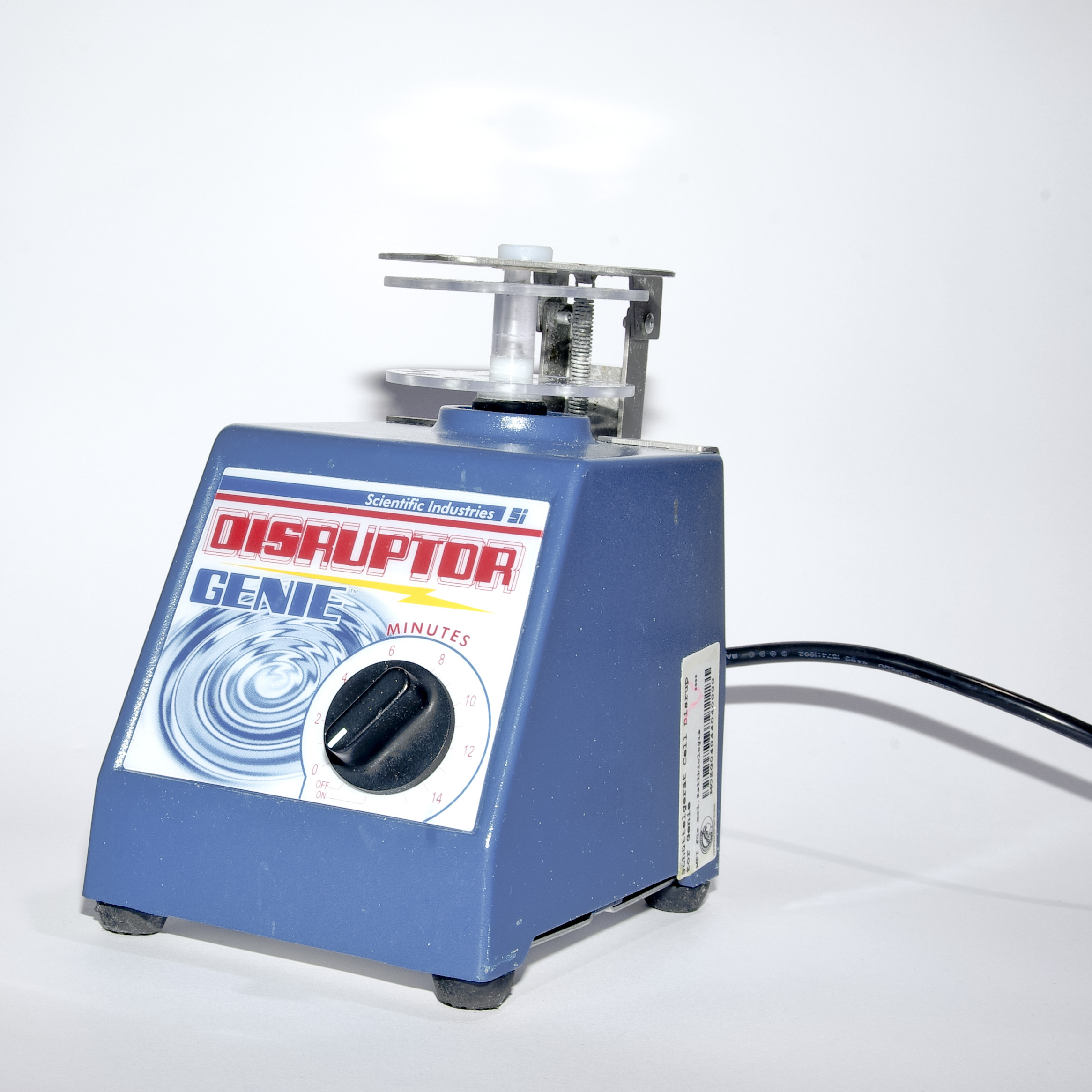
Laboratory cell disruptor

Cell disruption, sometimes referred to as digestion, is a method or process for releasing biological molecules from inside a cell.

== Methods ==
The production of biologically interesting molecules using cloning and culturing methods allows the study and manufacture of relevant molecules. Except for excreted molecules, cells producing molecules of interest must be disrupted. This page discusses various methods. Another method of disruption is called cell unroofing.

=== Bead method ===
A common laboratory-scale mechanical method for cell disruption uses glass, ceramic, or steel beads, 0.1–2 mm (0.004–0.08 in) in diameter, mixed with a sample suspended in an aqueous solution. First developed by Tim Hopkins in the late 1970s, the sample and bead mix is subjected to high level agitation by stirring or shaking. Beads collide with the cellular sample, cracking open the cell to release the intracellular components. Unlike some other methods, mechanical shear is moderate during homogenization resulting in excellent membrane or subcellular preparations. The method, often called "bead beating", works well for all types of cellular material - from spores to animal and plant tissues. It is the most widely used method of yeast lysis, and can yield breakage of well over 50% (up to 95%). It has the advantage over other mechanical cell disruption methods of being able to disrupt very small sample sizes, process many samples at a time with no cross-contamination concerns, and does not release potentially harmful aerosols in the process.

In the simplest example of the method, an equal volume of beads are added to a cell or tissue suspension in a test tube and the sample is vigorously mixed on a common laboratory vortex mixer. While processing times are slow, taking 3–10 times longer than that in specialty shaking machines, it works well for easily disrupted cells and is inexpensive.

Successful bead beating is dependent not only on design features of the shaking machine (which take into consideration shaking oscillations frequency, shaking throw or distance, shaking orientation and vial orientation), but also the selection of correct bead size (0.1–6 mm (0.004–0.2 in) diameter), bead composition (glass, ceramic, steel) and bead load in the vial.

In most laboratories, bead beating is done in batch sizes of one to twenty-four sealed, plastic vials or centrifuge tubes. The sample and tiny beads are agitated at about 2000 oscillations per minute in specially designed reciprocating shakers driven by high power electric motors. Cell disruption is complete in 1–3 minutes of shaking. Significantly faster rates of cell disruption are achieved with a bead beater variation called SoniBeast. Differing from conventional machines, it agitates the beads using a vortex motion at 20,000 oscillations per minute. Larger bead beater machines that hold deep-well microtiter plates also shorten process times, as do Bead Dispensers designed to quickly load beads into multiple vials or microplates. Pre-loaded vials and microplates are also available.

All high energy bead beating machines warm the sample about 10 degrees per minute. This is due to frictional collisions of the beads during homogenization. Cooling of the sample during or after bead beating may be necessary to prevent damage to heat-sensitive proteins such as enzymes. Sample warming can be controlled by bead beating for short time intervals with cooling on ice between each interval, by processing vials in pre-chilled aluminum vial holders or by circulating gaseous coolant through the machine during bead beating.

A different bead beater configuration, suitable for larger sample volumes, uses a rotating fluorocarbon rotor inside a 15, 50 or 200 ml chamber to agitate the beads. In this configuration, the chamber can be surrounded by a static cooling jacket. Using this same rotor/chamber configuration, large commercial machines are available to process many liters of cell suspension. Currently, these machines are limited to processing unicellular organisms such as yeast, algae and bacteria.

=== Cryopulverization ===
Samples with a tough extracellular matrix, such as animal connective tissue, some tumor biopsy samples, venous tissue, cartilage, seeds, etc., are reduced to a fine powder by impact pulverization at liquid nitrogen temperatures. This technique, known as cryopulverization, is based on the fact that biological samples containing a significant fraction of water become brittle at extremely cold temperatures. This technique was first described by Smucker and Pfister in 1975, who referred to the technique as cryo-impacting. The authors demonstrated cells are effectively broken by this method, confirming by phase and electron microscopy that breakage planes cross cell walls and cytoplasmic membranes.

The technique can be done by using a mortar and pestle cooled to liquid nitrogen temperatures, but use of this classic apparatus is laborious and sample loss is often a concern. Specialised stainless steel pulverizers generically known as Tissue Pulverizers are also available for this purpose. They require less manual effort, give good sample recovery and are easy to clean between samples. Advantages of this technique are higher yields of proteins and nucleic acids from small, hard tissue samples - especially when used as a preliminary step to mechanical or chemical/solvent cell disruption methods mentioned above.

=== High Pressure Cell Disruption ===
Since the 1940s high pressure has been used as a method of cell disruption, most notably by the French Pressure Cell Press, or French Press for short. This method was developed by Charles Stacy French and utilises high pressure to force cells through a narrow orifice, causing the cells to lyse due to the shear forces experienced across the pressure differential. While French Presses have become a staple item in many microbiology laboratories, their production has been largely discontinued, leading to a resurgence in alternate applications of similar technology.

Modern physical cell disruptors typically operate via either pneumatic or hydraulic pressure. Although pneumatic machines are typically lower cost, their performance can be unreliable due to variations in the processing pressure throughout the stroke of the air pump. It is generally considered that hydraulic machines offer superior lysing ability, especially when processing harder to break samples such as yeast or Gram-positive bacteria, due to their ability to maintain constant pressure throughout the piston stroke. As the French Press, which is operated by hydraulic pressure, is capable of over 90% lysis of most commonly used cell types it is often taken as the gold standard in lysis performance and modern machines are often compared against it not only in terms of lysis efficiency but also in terms of safety and ease of use. Some manufacturers are also trying to improve on the traditional design by altering properties within these machines other than the pressure driving the sample through the orifice. One such example is Constant Systems, who have recently shown that their Cell Disruptors not only match the performance of a traditional French Press, but also that they are striving towards attaining the same results at a much lower power.

Pressure Cycling Technology ("PCT"). PCT is a patented, enabling technology platform that uses alternating cycles of hydrostatic pressure between ambient and ultra-high levels (up to 90,000 psi) to safely, conveniently and reproducibly control the actions of molecules in biological samples, e.g., the rupture (lysis) of cells and tissues from human, animal, plant, and microbial sources, and the inactivation of pathogens. PCT-enhanced systems (instruments and consumables) address some challenging problems inherent in biological sample preparation. PCT advantages include: (a) extraction and recovery of more membrane proteins, (b) enhanced protein digestion, (c) differential lysis in a mixed sample base, (d) pathogen inactivation, (e) increased DNA detection, and (f) exquisite sample preparation process control.

The Microfluidizer method used for cell disruption strongly influences the physicochemical properties of the lysed cell suspension, such as particle size, viscosity, protein yield and enzyme activity. In recent years the Microfluidizer method has gained popularity in cell disruption due to its ease of use and efficiency at disrupting many different kinds of cells. The Microfluidizer technology was licensed from a company called Arthur D. Little and was first developed and utilized in the 1980s, initially starting as a tool for liposome creation. It has since been used in other applications such as cell disruption nanoemulsions, and solid particle size reduction, among others.

By using microchannels with fixed geometry, and an intensifier pump, high shear rates are generated that rupture the cells. This method of cell lysis can yield breakage of over 90% of E. coli cells.

Many proteins are extremely temperature-sensitive, and in many cases can start to denature at temperatures of only 4 degrees Celsius. Within the microchannels, temperatures exceed 4 degrees Celsius, but the machine is designed to cool quickly so that the time the cells are exposed to elevated temperatures is extremely short (residence time 25 ms-40 ms). Because of this effective temperature control, the Microfluidizer yields higher levels of active proteins and enzymes than other mechanical methods when the proteins are temperature-sensitive.

Viscosity changes are also often observed when disrupting cells. If the cell suspension viscosity is high, it can make downstream handling—such as filtration and accurate pipetting—quite difficult. The viscosity changes observed with a Microfluidizer are relatively low, and decreases with further additional passes through the machine.

In contrast to other mechanical disruption methods the Microfluidizer breaks the cell membranes efficiently but gently, resulting in relatively large cell wall fragments (450 nm), and thus making it easier to separate the cell contents. This can lead to shorter filtration times and better centrifugation separation.

Microfluidizer technology scales from one milliliter to thousands of liters.

=== Nitrogen decompression ===
For nitrogen decompression, large quantities of nitrogen are first dissolved in the cell under high pressure within a suitable pressure vessel. Then, when the gas pressure is suddenly released, the nitrogen comes out of the solution as expanding bubbles that stretch the membranes of each cell until they rupture and release the contents of the cell.

Nitrogen decompression is more protective of enzymes and organelles than ultrasonic and mechanical homogenizing methods and compares favorably to the controlled disruptive action obtained in a PTFE and glass mortar and pestle homogenizer. While other disruptive methods depend upon friction or a mechanical shearing action that generate heat, the nitrogen decompression procedure is accompanied by an adiabatic expansion that cools the sample instead of heating it.

The blanket of inert nitrogen gas that saturates the cell suspension and the homogenate offers protection against oxidation of cell components. Although other gases: carbon dioxide, nitrous oxide, carbon monoxide and compressed air have been used in this technique, nitrogen is preferred because of its non-reactive nature and because it does not alter the pH of the suspending medium. In addition, nitrogen is preferred because it is generally available at low cost and at pressures suitable for this procedure.

Once released, subcellular substances are not exposed to continued attrition that might denature the sample or produce unwanted damage. There is no need to watch for a peak between enzyme activity and percent disruption. Since nitrogen bubbles are generated within each cell, the same disruptive force is applied uniformly throughout the sample, thus ensuring unusual uniformity in the product. Cell-free homogenates can be produced.

The technique is used to homogenize cells and tissues, release intact organelles, prepare cell membranes, release labile biochemicals, and produce uniform and repeatable homogenates without subjecting the sample to extreme chemical or physical stress.

The method is particularly well suited for treating mammalian and other membrane-bound cells. It has also been used successfully for treating plant cells, for releasing virus from fertilized eggs and for treating fragile bacteria. It is not recommended for untreated bacterial cells. Yeast, fungus, spores and other materials with tough cell walls do not respond well to this method.

== See also ==
- Lysis
- Ultrasonic homogenizer
- Sonication
- Homogenization (chemistry)
- Homogenizer
