= French pressure cell press =

Apparatus used in biological experimentation

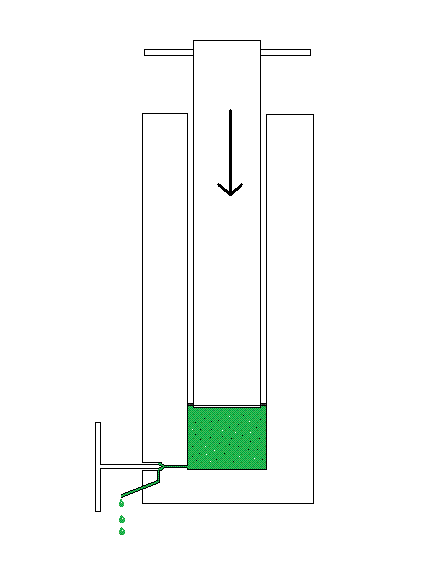
Diagram of a French press: The arrow indicates the direction of the force exerted on the piston by a hydraulic ram. The fluid compressed by the piston is prevented from escape by a rubber O-ring at its lower end.

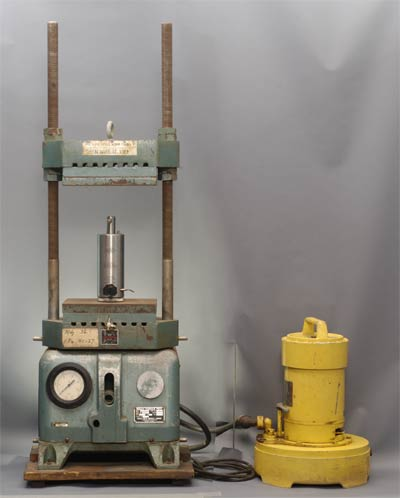
French press

The French pressure cell press, or French press, is an apparatus used in biological experimentation to disrupt the plasma membrane of cells by passing them through a narrow valve under high pressure. The French press can also be used for disintegration of chloroplasts, homogenates of animal tissue, and other biological particles. It is capable of disrupting cell walls while leaving the cell nucleus undisturbed. The French press was invented by Charles Stacy French of the Carnegie Institution of Washington. The press uses an external hydraulic pump to drive a piston within a larger cylinder that contains the liquid sample. The highly pressurized sample is then squeezed past a needle valve. As the sample passes through the valve, the fluid experiences shear stress and decompression, causing cellular disruption. The major components of a French press are made of stainless steel to prevent sample contamination.

A French press is commonly used to break the resilient plasma membrane and cell walls of bacteria and other microorganisms for isolation of proteins and other cellular components. The disruption of cells in a French press generates 'inside-out' membrane vesicles which are required for many in vitro biochemical assays. The cell is typically chilled overnight before use to preserve enzymatic activities.

Disadvantages of the press include that it is not well suited for processing large sample volumes, and is somewhat difficult to operate as a result of the large weight of the assembly (about 14 kg). Another disadvantage is that the input cell volume must be free of large cell clumps, which requires a pre-processing step (typically, by sonication). If cell clumps are not removed prior to processing, clogging of the valve occurs, and the unit must be cleaned thoroughly before the processing can continue. As a result, many protein purification labs find that the use of lysozyme and sonication is sufficient for routine bacterial protein expression.

Other technologies, such as sonication and ball mills, are available for many of the same purposes, and have their own advantages and disadvantages. For example, sonication can generate high shear forces that break cellular DNA into small fragments. With a French press, the shear force can be carefully modulated by adjusting the piston pressure. The Press provides a single pass through the point of maximum shear force, limiting damage to delicate biological structures due to repeated shear, as occurs in other disruption methods.

== See also ==
- Cell disruption
- Homogenizer
- Homogenization (chemistry)
- Ultrasonic homogenizer
