= Miniemulsion =

Particular type of emulsion

A miniemulsion (also known as a nanoemulsion) is a particular type of emulsion which is obtained by applying high shear to a mixture comprising two immiscible liquid phases (for example oil and water), one or more surfactants and, possibly, one or more co-surfactants (typical examples are hexadecane or cetyl alcohol). They usually have nanodroplets with uniform size distribution (20–500 nm) and are also known as sub-micron, mini-, and ultra-fine grain emulsions.

Nanoemulsification is the process of emulsification in the nanoscale.

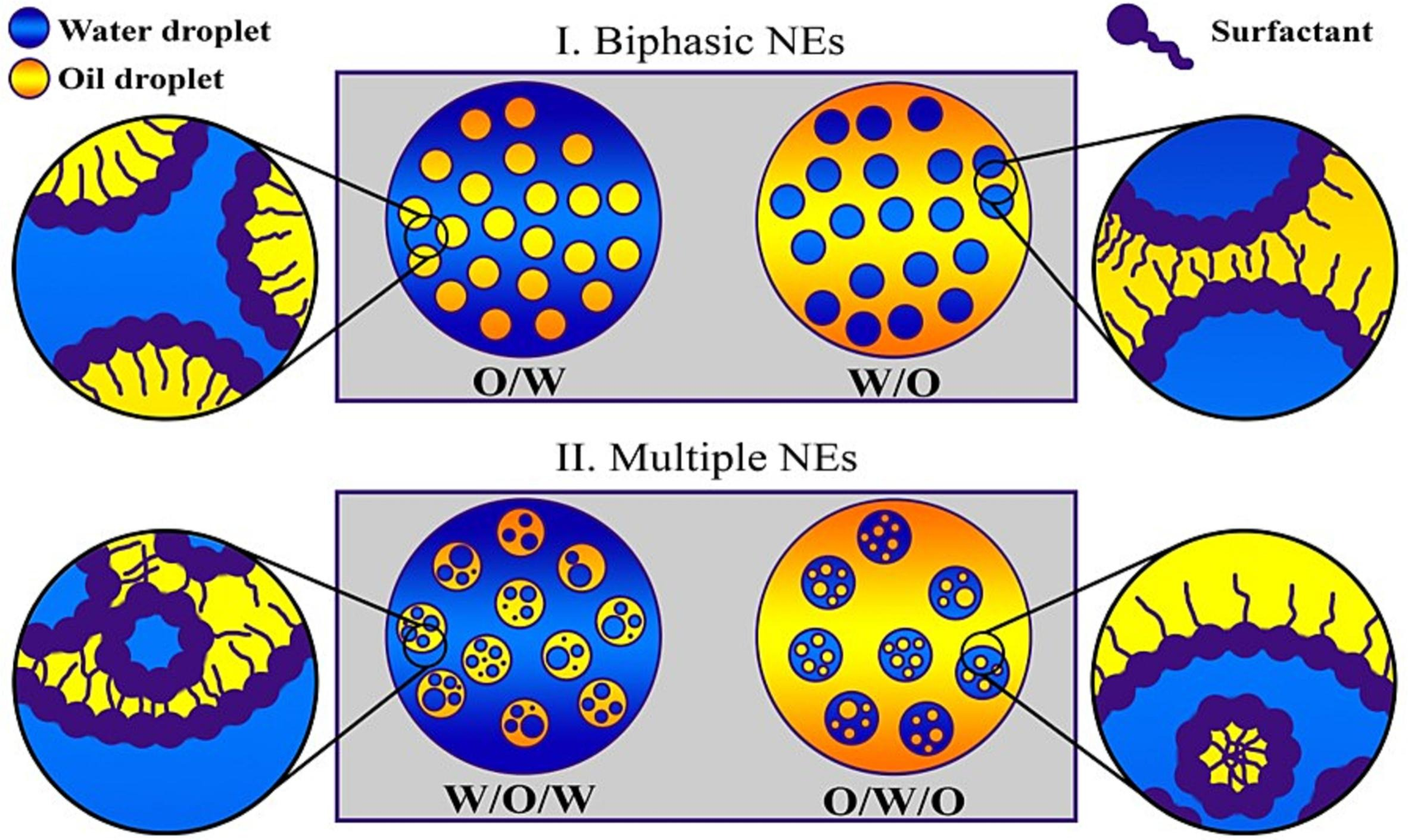
Schematic illustration of nanoemulsion structure, including the biphasic systems (O/W or W/O), in which an appropriate volume of the internal oil phase is disseminated in the bulk aqueous solution or vice versa; and the multiple systems (W/O/W or O/W/O), within a single system, the inner water phase is dispersed in an oil phase, which is then dispersed in a bulk aqueous phase or vice versa.

== How to prepare a miniemulsion ==
1. Selection of ingredients: The first step in creating a nanoemulsion is to select the ingredients, which include the oil, water, and emulsifying agent. The type and proportions of these ingredients will affect the stability and properties of the final emulsion.
2. Preparation of oil and aqueous phases: The oil and water phases are separately prepared, with any desired ingredients, such as surfactants or flavoring agents, added at this step.
3. Mixing oil and emulsifier with stirrer: Next, the oil and water phases are mixed in the presence of an emulsifying agent, typically using a high-shear mixing device such as a homogenizer.
4. Aging and stabilization: The emulsion is typically aged at room temperature to allow the droplets to stabilize, after which it can be cooled or heated as required.
5. Optimizing and characterization: The droplet size and stability are then optimized by adjusting the ingredients and process parameters, such as temperature, pH, and mixing conditions. The nanoemulsion is also sterilized by filtration with 0.22μm. Several methods, such as DLS, TEM, and SEM, can characterize the final nanoemulsion's properties.
IUPAC definition

Mini-emulsion: emulsion in which the particles of the dispersed phase have diameters in the range from approximately 50 nm to 1 μm.

Note 1: Mini-emulsions are usually stabilized against diffusion degradation (Ostwald ripening (ref. )) by a compound insoluble in the continuous phase.

Note 2: The dispersed phase contains mixed stabilizers, e.g., an ionic surfactant, such as sodium dodecyl sulfate (n-dodecyl sulfate sodium) and a short aliphatic chain alcohol ("co-surfactant") for colloidal stability, or a water-insoluble compound, such as a hydrocarbon ("co-stabilizer" frequently and improperly called a "co-surfactant") limiting diffusion degradation. Mini-emulsions are usually stable for at least several days.

Mini-emulsion polymerization: Polymerization of a mini-emulsion of monomer in which all of the polymerization occurs within preexisting monomer particles without the formation of new particles.

== Methods of preparing nanoemulsions/miniemulsions ==
There are two general types of methods for preparing miniemulsions:

- High-energy methods - For the high-energy methods, the shearing proceeds usually via exposure to high power ultrasound of the mixture or with a high-pressure homogenizer, which are high-shearing processes.
- Low-energy methods - For the low-energy methods, the water-in-oil emulsion is usually prepared and then transformed into an oil-in-water miniemulsion by changing either composition or temperature. The water-in-oil emulsion is diluted dropwise with water to an inversion point or gradually cooled to a phase inversion temperature. The emulsion inversion point and phase inversion temperature cause a significant decrease in the interfacial tension between two liquids, thereby generating very tiny oil droplets dispersed in the water.

Miniemulsions are kinetically stable but thermodynamically unstable. Oil and water are incompatible in nature, and the interface between them is not favored. Therefore, given a sufficient amount of time, the oil and water in miniemulsions separate again. Various mechanisms such as gravitational separation, flocculation, coalescence, and Ostwald ripening result in instability. In an ideal miniemulsion system, coalescence and Ostwald ripening are suppressed thanks to the presence of the surfactant and co-surfactant. With the addition of surfactants, stable droplets are then obtained, which have typically a size between 50 and 500 nm.

== Instruments needed in nanoemulsions ==
=== Sterile filter ===
A sterile filter is a device used to remove microorganisms and other contaminants from a liquid or gas, making it sterile. Sterile filters are commonly used in the medical, pharmaceutical, and biotech industries to ensure that the products produced are free of bacteria and other harmful organisms.

There are different types of filters which include:

- Membrane filters: These filters use a porous membrane to block microorganisms and other particles physically. They are available in different pore sizes and materials, such as cellulose acetate, polypropylene, and nylon, to suit different applications.
- Depth filters: These filters use a matrix of fibers, beads, or powders to trap particles and microorganisms. Examples of depth filters include cellulose, glass fiber, and diatomaceous earth.
- Adsorptive filters: These filters use adsorbent materials, such as activated carbon, or specialized resins or beads, to remove certain types of contaminants by chemical adsorption.

=== Nanogenizer ===
A nanogenizer, also known as a high-pressure homogenizer or a microfluidizer, is a device used to create small droplets or particles by applying high pressure to a liquid mixture. These devices can be used to produce nanoemulsions, as well as other types of emulsions and suspensions. They work by passing the mixture through a small orifice under high pressure, which causes the liquid to be sheared and broken into small droplets or particles. The size of the droplets or particles can be controlled by adjusting the pressure and the design of the orifice.

=== Nanoparticle sizer ===
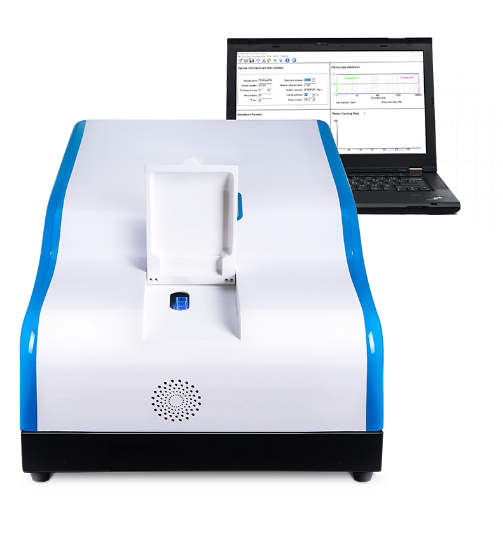
The dual-light particle analyzer

A nanoparticle sizer, also known as a nanoparticle analyzer, is a device used to measure the size, size distribution, and concentration of nanoparticles in a sample. The size of nanoparticles is typically in the range of 1 to 100 nanometers (nm), and they are much smaller than the particles that can be measured with conventional particle size analyzers.

== Applications ==
Miniemulsions have wide application in the synthesis of nanomaterials and in the pharmaceutical and food industries. For example, miniemulsion-based processes are, therefore, particularly adapted for the generation of nanomaterials. There is a fundamental difference between traditional emulsion polymerisation and a miniemulsion polymerisation. Particle formation in the former is a mixture of micellar and homogeneous nucleation, particles formed via miniemulsion however are mainly formed by droplet nucleation. In the pharmaceutical industry, oil droplets act as tiny containers that carry water-insoluble drugs, and the water provides a mild environment that is compatible with the human body. Moreover, nanoemulsions that carry drugs allow the drugs to crystallize in a controlled size with a good dissolution rate. Finally, in the food industry, miniemulsions can not only be loaded with water-insoluble nutrients, such as beta-carotene and curcumin, but also improve the nutrients' digestibility. Miniemulsions are also used in the creation of cannabinoid infused beverages and foods. Emulsifying cannabiniods has shown to increase bioavailability and digestion time.

== See also ==
- Emulsion
- Nanoemulsion
- Emulsification
- Surfactant
- Colloid
- Nanoparticle
- Nanomaterials
- Emulsion polymerization
- Homogenization (chemistry)
- Ostwald ripening
- Dynamic light scattering
- Microfluidics
- Nanotechnology
