= Sonoelectrochemistry =

Sonoelectrochemistry is the application of ultrasound in electrochemistry. Like sonochemistry, sonoelectrochemistry was discovered in the early 20th century. The effects of power ultrasound on electrochemical systems and important electrochemical parameters were originally demonstrated by Moriguchi and then by Schmid and Ehert when the researchers investigated the influence of ultrasound on concentration polarisation, metal passivation and the production of electrolytic gases in aqueous solutions. In the late 1950s, Kolb and Nyborg showed that the electrochemical solution (or electroanalyte) hydrodynamics in an electrochemical cell was greatly increased in the presence of ultrasound and described this phenomenon as acoustic streaming. In 1959, Penn et al. demonstrated that sonication had a great effect on the electrode surface activity and electroanalyte species concentration profile throughout the solution. In the early 1960s, the electrochemist Allen J. Bard showed in controlled potential coulometry experiments that ultrasound significantly enhances mass transport of electrochemical species from the bulk solution to the electroactive surface. In the range of ultrasonic frequencies [20 kHz – 2 MHz], ultrasound has been applied to many electrochemical systems, processes and areas of electrochemistry (to name but a few: electroplating, electrodeposition, electropolymerisation, electrocoagulation, organic electrosynthesis, materials electrochemistry, environmental electrochemistry, electroanalytical chemistry, hydrogen energy and fuel cell technology) both in academia and industry, as this technology offers several benefits over traditional technologies. The advantages are as follows: significant thinning of the diffusion layer thickness (δ) at the electrode surface; increase in electrodeposit/electroplating thickness; increase in electrochemical rates, yields and efficiencies; increase in electrodeposit porosity and hardness; increase in gas removal from electrochemical solutions; increase in electrode cleanliness and hence electrode surface activation; lowering in electrode overpotentials (due to metal depassivation and gas bubble removal generated at the electrode surface induced by cavitation and acoustic streaming); and suppression in electrode fouling (depending on the ultrasonic frequency and power).

To date, over 3,500 publications inc. patents, technical, research and review articles have been written on the subject with the vast majority being published post-1990 after a review paper from Mason et al. entitled 'Sonoelectrochemistry' highlighting the extraordinary effects of sonication on enhancing mass transport, aiding solution degassing, improving electrode surface cleaning, producing radical species (via sonolysis) and increasing electrochemical products and yields.

== See also ==
- Sonochemistry
- Sonication
- Ultrasonics
