= Kevin Kendall =

British physicist

- Education: University of Cambridge
- Known for: Microtubular SOFC; JKR model
- Scientific career
- Fields: Physics

Kevin Kendall FRS is a British physicist who received a London external BSc degree at Salford CAT in 1965 while working as an engineering apprentice at Joseph Lucas Gas Turbine Ltd. He became interested in surface science during his Ph.D. study in the Cavendish Laboratory and devised a novel method for measuring the true contact area between solids using an ultrasonic transmission. That led to new arguments about the adhesion of contacting solids, giving a theory of adhesion and fracture that applies to a wide range of problems of high industrial significance, especially in the chemical industry where fine particles stick together tenaciously. His book Crack Control published by Elsevier summarizes many of these applications.

== Education ==
Kendall first went to school at St Edwards Darwen but when his mother Margaret died in 1950 the family moved to Accrington near his father Cyril's work at Joseph Lucas Gas Turbine Ltd. On passing the eleven plus exam at St Annes Accrington in 1955 he studied at St. Mary's College, Blackburn, completing his A levels in 1961. Cyril died in 1960 so Joseph Lucas offered Kevin a student apprenticeship in Physics at Salford CAT. His external degree followed in 1965, allowing him to do one year of R&D work on rocket modelling before leaving for Pembroke College Cambridge in October 1966. Three years of study at the Cavendish Laboratory in Free School Lane was successful in analyzing the transmission of ultrasonic waves through metal and other contacts. He received his Doctor of Philosophy from the University of Cambridge in 1970 under the supervision of David Tabor.

== Career ==
In 1969, Kendall joined British Railways Research on London Road, Derby where the new Advanced Passenger Train (APT) was being developed, requiring industrial development of wheel-to-rail adhesion and corrosion problems. While studying the adhesion of nano-particles generated from corroding iron brake-block dust, he found that the standard pull-off testing methods gave large errors and published his first paper to show that crack theory must be used to analyze these adhesion measurements just as Griffith had postulated for glass-cracks in 1920. This coincided with a collaboration linking Kenneth L. Johnson and Alan D. Roberts in the Engineering Department at Cambridge University on the adhesion of elastic spheres. Roberts had performed experiments on the contact and surface attraction of optically smooth rubber spheres during his doctoral studies, while Johnson had solved the stress field problem twelve years earlier. But Johnson had not applied Griffith's energy-equilibrium condition. Kendall produced the mathematical answer in a couple of hours on 11 April 1970, fitting the experimental results reasonably well. The joint paper was published in 1971, one of the most highly cited papers in Royal Society Proceedings A.

This breakthrough in understanding adhesion problems allowed Kendall to take four years out of the industry, first at Monash University as QEII fellow from 1972 and then in Akron University during 1975 supervised by Alan Gent who co-founded the Adhesion Society in the USA during 1978 because of the widening applications of adhesive and composite materials. It was during this period from 1972 to 1975 that Kendall solved several long-standing problems of composite materials:

1. Why are composites like Fiberglass tougher than the brittle components EG glass and polymer
2. How does a crack deflect along with a brittle interface
3. Strength of a lap joint does not exist; lap joints have been known for 5000 years but the solution to lap failure was only found in 1975

The difficulty of industry R&D is that there is no time between inventing, patenting, and commercializing to analyze the science properly, so it was not until 1997 when Kendall took a sabbatical in Australia that he found the opportunity to summarize these findings in his first book 'The Sticky Universe'. Unfortunately, misapprehensions, errors, and anachronisms in science last for centuries and there has been little change in engineering courses and ASTM standards in this millennium to make necessary adjustments in faulty fracture text-books, as recounted in recent conferences that demonstrated 'strength of brittle materials' always varies with the size of the samples being tested and so has little meaning, overriding Galileo's original definition from 1638.

Kendall believed that industry was the main source of technological advancement and joined the Colloid & Interface Science Group at Imperial Chemical Industries (ICI) in Runcorn to invent new processes and materials. Several patents arose from his new process for mixing cement, using about 1% of polymer additive to make a novel low porosity product with ten times the strength of standard mortar and five times the toughness. This eventually led to improved ceramic processing giving better superconductors and fuel cells among numerous other applications. He and the ICI group received the Ambrose Congreve award for this invention because the energy crisis was intense and new low energy materials and processing were needed.

Another discovery in the 1970s was the limit of grinding fine particles in ball mills, a phenomenon that has been observed for millennia. When grinding limestone in a mill, the particles are reduced in size to a few micrometers, then go no finer. This limit was explained by studying cracks in smaller samples until the crack would fail to extend because plastic flow intervened.

Kendall was awarded the Adhesion Society award for excellence in 1998.

He returned to the industry after starting the spin-out company Adelan in 1996 and is CTO since 2021. The mission is to replace combustion with hydrogen-fuel-cell power generation to avoid climate crisis.

== Academic research ==
During 1989, when ICI decided to focus its business on pharmaceuticals and drop its research in carbon fibers and other advanced materials, Kendall took early retirement and joined his long-time colleague Derek Birchall at Keele University collaborating with the ceramics institution Ceram Research in 1993. The patents on ceramic processing were used to develop new products, especially Solid Oxide Fuel Cells (SOFCs) that are expected to grow in market size to $1.4 bn by 2025. Kendall's invention of fine cell tubes allowed rapid start-up and led to many academic papers and two books that were highly cited. Kendall moved to the University of Birmingham in 2000 and built a substantial group in Chemical Engineering working on hydrogen and fuel cells. He and his colleagues, Prof. Dr. Bruno Georges Pollet and Dr Waldemar Bujalski opened the first UK green-hydrogen station refueling five fuel-cell-battery-taxis in 2008 and has continued since his retiring from teaching in 2011 to encourage city/industry leadership in clean-energy transport, not achievable by academics, linking with Asia where the growing car population nearing 1 billion is a desperate problem. He was first in showing that the hydrogen fuel cell vehicle used 50% less energy than a comparable combustion car. Meanwhile, Kendall was applying his adhesion ideas to cancer cells, viruses, and nano-particles. According to Google Scholar, his works have been cited on more than 27,000 occasions, unusual for an industrial researcher.

He was elected Fellow of the Royal Society in 1993. He continues to push forward the green hydrogen revolution, running a fleet of hydrogen-fuel-cell battery vehicles in the Birmingham Clean Air Zone.
