= Sonocatalysis =

Method of catalysis

Sonocatalysis is a field of sonochemistry which is based on the use of ultrasound to change the reactivity of a catalyst in homogenous or heterogenous catalysis. It is generally used to support catalysis. This method of catalysis has been known since the creation of sonochemistry in 1927 by physicists Alfred Lee Loomis and Robert Williams Wood. Sonocatalysis depends on ultrasounds, which were discovered in 1794 by the Italian biologist Lazzaro Spallanzani.

== Principle ==
=== General concept ===
Sonocatalysis is not a self-sufficient catalysis technique but instead supports a catalyst in the reaction. Sonocatalysis and sonochemistry both come from a phenomenon called "acoustic cavitation", which happens when a liquid is irradiated by ultrasounds. Ultrasounds will create huge local variations of pressure and temperature, affecting the liquid's relative density and creating cavitation bubbles when liquid pressure decreases under its vapor pressure. When these bubbles blow up, some energy is released, which comes from the transformation of kinetic energy into heat. Sonocatalysis may happen in the homogenous phase or the heterogenous phase. This depends on the phase the catalyst is in, compared to the reaction.

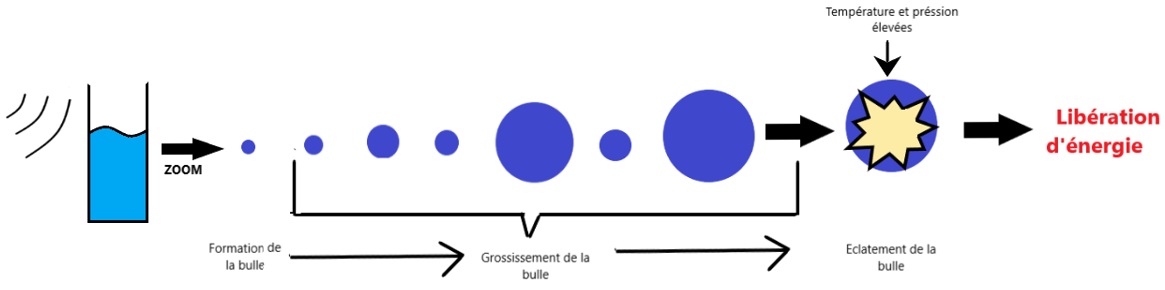
Principle of energy recovery using acoustic cavitation

The blowing of cavitation bubbles can cause intense local pressure and temperature conditions, going to a 1000 atm pressure and a 5000 K temperature. This may provoke the creation of highly energetic radicals. Bubbles' blowing causes the formation of hydroxyl radical ($\ce{HO^{.}}$)and hydrogen radical ($\ce{H^{.}}$) in a water-based environment. Next, these radicals may combine to produce different molecules, such as water ($\ce{H2O}$), hydroperoxyl ($\ce{HO2^{.}}$), hydrogen peroxide ($\ce{H2O2}$), and dioxygen ($\ce{O2}$).

Radical formation reactions due to the decomposition of water by ultrasound can be described this way:

$\ce{H2O ->[{)))}] HO{.} + H{.}}$

$\ce{.OH + H. -> H2O2}$

$\ce{.H + O2 ->HO2.}$

$\ce{2HO. -> H2O2}$

$\ce{2HO2.->H2O2 +O2}$

$\ce{H2O +.OH->H2O2 +H.}$

Energy from ultrasonic irradiation differs from heat energy or electromagnetic radiation energy in time, pressure, and energy received by a molecule.

=== Direct and indirect irradiation ===
There are two types of irradiation in sonocatalysis and sonochemistry: direct and indirect. In direct irradiation, the solution is in touch with a sound wave emitter (generally a transducer); while in indirect irradiation, these two elements are separated by an irradiated bath. The bath transmits the radiations to the solution through convection. While indirect irradiation is the most used irradiation technique, direct irradiation is possible too, especially when the irradiated bath may be the container for the solution.

== Catalysts ==
=== Homogenous catalysts ===
Metal carbonyls, such as Fe(CO)_{5}, Fe_{3}(CO)_{12}, Cr(CO)_{6}, Mo(CO)_{6} and W(CO)_{6}, are very often used in homogenous catalysis because stay stable at standard temperature and pressure due to their structures. Their catalytic capacities are well-known and efficient.

=== Heterogenous catalysts ===
Carbon-based species like carbon nanotubes, graphene, graphene oxide, activated carbon, biochar, g-C_{3}N_{4}, carbon-doped materials, Buckminsterfullerene (C60), and mesoporous carbons are very often used in heterogeneous sonocatalysis. These species are great sonocatalysts because they favour the degradation process during sonocatalysis. They have a huge activity and stability for sonocatalysis and they show the nucleation effect. These properties come from features like their porous structures, optic activities, electrical resistivities and conductivities, chemical stabilities, and forces. These species are becoming more frequently used.

== Materials ==
=== Transducers ===
To generate ultrasound, sonocatalysis needs equipment other than catalysts, like transducers that create ultrasound with the transformation from electrical energy to mechanical energy. There are two types of transducers: piezoelectric transducers and magnetostrictic transducers. Piezoelectric transducers are used more often because they are cheaper, lighter, and less bulky. These transducers are constituted of single crystals or ceramic and two electrodes fixed on the side. These electrodes receive a voltage which equals at the most to the transducer's resonance frequency. This causes single crystals to be compressed or dilated, creating a wave.

==== Some examples of transducers ====
- The ultrasonic cleaner is a bath full of liquid. The liquid can transmit acoustic energy from the bottom of the bath to the solution in the container. This cleaner often generates ultrasound with low frequencies (from 20 to 60 kHz) and is inexpensive. However, it has some inconveniences, like the difficulty of controlling the liquid temperature in the bath, and the fact that irradiation isn't equal everywhere in the bath.
- The cup-horn sonicator is similar to the ultrasonic cleaner, but it may irradiate using both direct and indirect irradiation. While ultrasonic cleaning only generates ultrasound with low frequencies, the cup-horn sonicator can generate ultrasound with high frequencies too, and with a higher intensity. However, this equipment is very expensive due to its conception.
- The "whistle" reactor is a reactor in which the reaction mix is continuously pumped through an adjustable-width opening, in a delimited area where cavitation happens. Ultrasonic waves are generated in this area by the vibration of blades during the passing of the pumped solution. This reactor is often used for homogenous reaction mixes, as the solid part of heterogenous mixes cannot pass through the whistle. This type of reactor is less frequently used.

== Applications ==
The use of sonocatalysis has risen. Today, sonocatalysis is used in many fields like medicine, pharmacology, metallurgy, environment, nanotechnology, and wastewater treatment.

=== Health ===
==== Active ingredient synthesis ====
Consider the example of pyrazole, a compound that has antimicrobial, antihypertensive, anti-inflammatory and anticonvulsant activities. Several studies have showed that sonocatalysis could increase pyrazole synthesis yield. A study developed a new way of synthesis for this molecule, using ecological and economical reactants while keeping a high yield and using sonocatalysis.

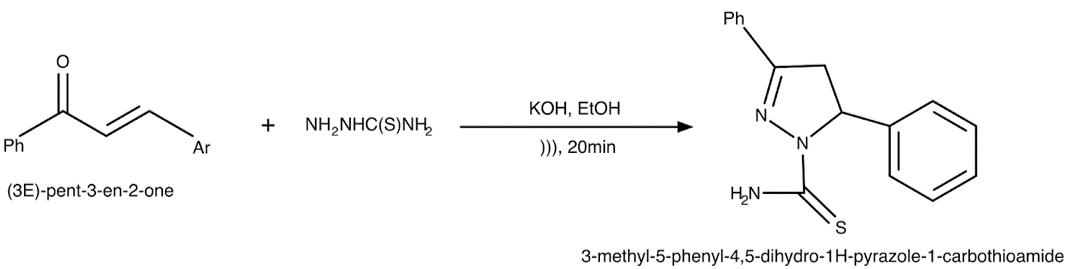
3-methyl-5-phenyl-4,5-dihydro-1H-pyrazole-1-carbothioamide synthesis under sonocatalysis

The following table contains yield information for the 3-methyl-5-phenyl-4,5-dihydro-1H-pyrazole-1-carbothioamide synthesis:

3-methyl-5-phenyl-4,5-dihydro-1H-pyrazole-1-carbothioamide synthesis duration
	Duration (min)	Yield (%)
Reaction under sonocatalysis (*)	20	76
Reaction without sonocatalysis (*)	20	16
Literature	120	66

(*) synthesis conditions are described in the picture above

=== Environment ===
==== Pollutants degradation ====
Sonocatalysis is used to degrade pollutants. Ultrasound can generate the $\ce{HO^{.}}$ radical from a water molecule. This radical is a strong oxidizing agent, which can degrade persistent organic pollutant. However, the reaction speed for hydrophobic compounds is low, so ultrasound is often paired with a solid catalyst. The addition of this catalyst means the addition of atomic nuclei that amplifies the cavity phenomenon and the ultrasonic efficiency. Near the solid-liquid contact surface, pressure is applied on one of the sides of the bubble, causing a more violent blowing of the bubble.

==== 46 cationic red bleaching ====
This principle can apply to the oxidated bleaching of 46 cationic red by zinc oxide held by bentonite. More than 10% to 20% of organic dyes are lost and released in nature. Finding new ways to improve dyes' bleaching is important, as these dyes may be toxic and carcinogenic. The oxidation comes from the $\ce{HO^{.}}$ radical, whose oxidant capacities are known. A higher concentration of the $\ce{HO^{.}}$ radical provokes a better 46 red cationic bleaching, as the yield for bleaching of cationic red is 17.8% before using ultrasound and 81.6% after using ultrasound. However, sonocatalysis' efficiency mainly comes from the combination of both catalyst and ultrasound. For example, we observe a cationic red bleaching of only 25.4% by applying only ultrasound.

==== Tetracycline elimination ====
Another example of pollutant degradation is the elimination of tetracycline, an antibiotic that is frequently found as a pollutant in wastewater. When tetracycline is dissolved in aqueous solution, using only ultrasound is inefficient to degrade tetracycline, because it is kinetically unfavourable.

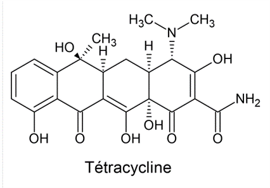
Tetracycline molecule

The addition of catalysts like titanium dioxide $\ce{TiO2}$ or hydrogen peroxide $\ce{H2O2}$ to ultrasound may speed up degradation; thirty minutes are enough when ultrasound and both catalysts are used.

==== Rhodamine B degradation ====
Sonocatalysis is used in rhodamine B degradation too. Rhodamine B is a synthetic dye that may be harmful for aquatic plants when released in wastewater.

Rhodamine B molecule

=== Reactions ===
==== Fenton's reaction ====
Sonocatalysis can be applied for reactions like Fenton's reaction. By associating sonocatalysis (at a 20 kHz frequency) and Fenton's reaction, with a 5.0 mg/L iron chloride ( $\ce{FeCl2}$) mass concentration and a pH of 4, degradation efficiency is about 80% after 12 minutes.
