= International Journal of Hydrogen Energy =

- Discipline: Hydrogen energy
- Language: English
- Edited by: T. Nejat Veziroglu

Publication details
- History: 1976—present
- Publisher: Elsevier
- Frequency: Weekly
- Impact factor: 8.1 (2023)

Standard abbreviations
- ISO 4: Int. J. Hydrog. Energy

Indexing
- CODEN: IJHEDX
- ISSN: 0360-3199
- LCCN: 76644490
- OCLC no.: 884093395

Links
- Journal homepage; Online archive; Journal page at society website

The International Journal of Hydrogen Energy is a peer-reviewed scientific journal covering all aspects of hydrogen energy, including hydrogen generation and storage. It is an official journal of the International Association for Hydrogen Energy, HEPLLC is the publisher, and Elsevier is the publishing house. Established in 1976, the journal became monthly in 1982, biweekly in 2008, 36/yr in 2013, and weekly in 2015. The editor in chief is Emre Veziroglu and the founding editor in chief is his father Turhan Nejat Veziroğlu (University of Miami).

In 2023, the journal was criticized for rejecting papers that do not cite enough of the journal's previously published papers.

== Abstracting and indexing ==
The journal is abstracted and indexed in:

- Compendex/Engineering Index
- Chemical Abstracts
- Current Contents/Engineering, Computing & Technology
- Inspec
- VINITI Database RAS
- Scopus
- Science Citation Index Expanded
- TOC Premier

According to the Journal Citation Reports, the journal has a 2023 impact factor of 8.1.

== See also ==
- Green methanol
