= World Hydrogen Energy Conference =

World Hydrogen Energy Conference (WHEC) is a series of international events covering the complex issues of utilizing hydrogen as an energy carrier. These include methods of production of hydrogen, materials for hydrogen storage, infrastructure development and hydrogen utilization technologies, particularly fuel cell system application. WHEC is held every two years at different locations around the world and, in combination with World Hydrogen Technology Conventions (WHTC), is organized with the support of International Association for Hydrogen Energy.

== Past events ==
| Sno | Year | Venue | Date |
|---|---|---|---|
| 1 | 1976 | Miami Beach, United States | - |
| 2 | 1978 | Zurich, Switzerland | - |
| 3 | 1980 | Tokyo, Japan | - |
| 4 | 1982 | Pasadena, United States | - |
| 5 | 1984 | Toronto, Canada | - |
| 6 | 1986 | Vienna, Austria | - |
| 13 | 2000 | Beijing, China | - |
| 12 | 1998 | Buenos Aires, Argentina | - |
| 11 | 1996 | Stuttgart, Germany | - |
| 10 | 1994 | Cocoa Beach, United States | - |
| 9 | 1992 | Paris, France | |
| 8 | 1990 | Honolulu, United States | |
| 7 | 1988 | Moscow, Russia | |
| 18 | 2010 | Essen, Germany | 16–20 May 2010 |
| 17 | 2008 | Brisbane, Australia | 15–18 June 2008 |
| 16 | 2006 | Lyon, France | 13–16 June 2008 |
| 15 | 2004 | WHEC, Yokohama, Japan | |
| 14 | 2002 | Montreal, Canada | |
| 19 | 2012 | Toronto, Canada | Jun 3–7 |
| 20 | 2014 | Gwangju, South Korea | Jun 15–20 |
| 21 | 2016 | Zaragoza, Spain | |
| 22 | 2018 | Rio de Janeiro, Brazil | Jun 17–22 |
| 23 | 2022 | Istanbul, Turkey | Jun 26–30 |

== Upcoming events ==
| Sno | Year | Venue | Date |
|---|---|---|---|
| 24 | 2024 | Mexico | TBD |
