= Adam Weber (engineer) =

American chemical engineer (born 1976)

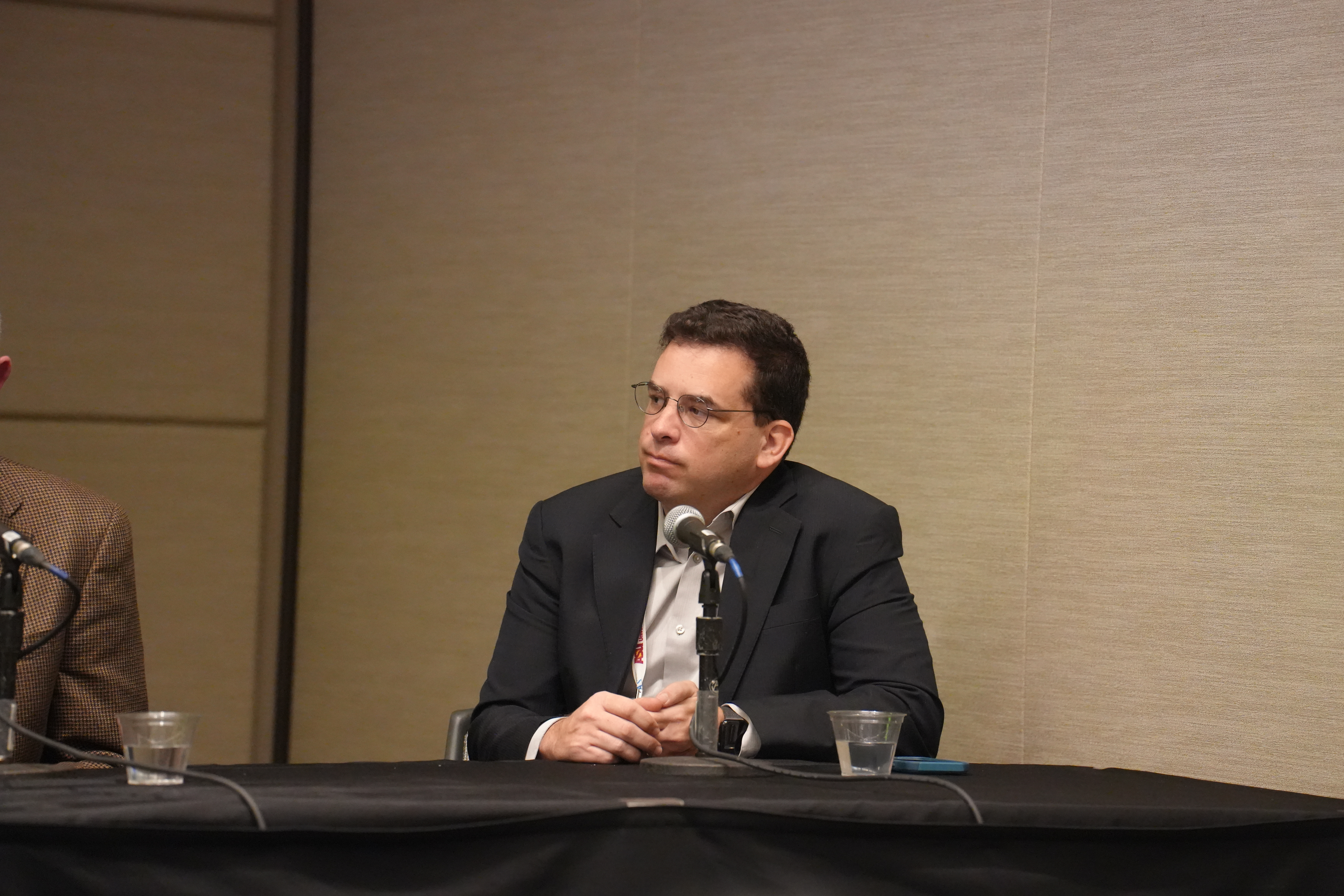
- Weber in 2026
- Born: Adam Zev Weber; December 13, 1976; U.S.A
- Education: Tufts University (BSChE, MS); University of California, Berkeley (PhD)
- Known for: Work on fuel cells, hydrogen energy systems, and energy storage technologies.
- Scientific career
- Fields: Energy Technologies; Physical Chemistry (incl. Structural); Macromolecular and Materials Chemistry; Materials Engineering; Chemical Engineering; Electrochemistry; Simulation and Modelling; Theoretical and Computational Chemistry
- Workplaces: Lawrence Berkeley National Laboratory (LBNL); Joint Center for Artificial Photosynthesis (JCAP); DOE Fuel-Cell Performance and Durability (FC-PAD); HydroGen - Advanced Water Splitting Materials Consortium; Editorial Board of the Journal of Applied Electrochemistry
- Doctoral advisor: Maria Flytzani-Stephanopoulos; John Newman

Adam Zev Weber (born December 13, 1976) is an American chemical engineer known for his research on electrochemical energy systems, including fuel cells, electrolyzers, and energy storage technologies. He is a senior scientist and leads the Energy Conversion Group at Lawrence Berkeley National Laboratory.

== Education ==
Weber earned Bachelor's and master's degrees in chemical engineering from Tufts University. He completed his Ph.D. in chemical engineering at the University of California, Berkeley, where his research focused on transport phenomena in polymer-electrolyte fuel cells.

== Research and contributions ==
Following his doctorate, Weber joined Lawrence Berkeley National Laboratory (LBNL), where he focuses on the modeling and analysis of electrochemical energy-conversion systems, including fuel cells and electrolyzers. His work examines transport processes, reaction kinetics, and degradation mechanisms in these systems.

At Berkeley Lab, Weber has held leadership roles in hydrogen and fuel-cell research programs and has contributed to U.S. Department of Energy initiatives on clean energy technologies. He has also been involved in collaborative research efforts on hydrogen production and electrochemical energy systems. Weber has contributed to research on hydrogen as an energy carrier and its role in decarbonization, including work related to the U.S. Department of Energy's Hydrogen Shot initiative. He has also participated in national research consortia focused on hydrogen production, fuel-cell performance, and energy storage systems.

He is the author or co-author of numerous scientific publications in electrochemistry and energy systems. His work includes studies of polymer-electrolyte fuel cells and electrochemical transport phenomena, including a review article in Chemical Reviews.

== Honors and awards ==
Weber is the recipient of a number of awards including:

- 2013 Presidential Early Career Awards for Scientists and Engineers
- 2014 Charles W Tobias Young Investigator Award of the Electrochemical Society
- 2014 Kavli Fellow of the National Academy of Sciences
- 2018 Electrochemical Society Fellow
- 2024 Neil Armstrong™ Award of Excellence

== Publications ==
Weber has authored numerous peer-reviewed publications in electrochemistry and energy systems. His work includes both fundamental studies and applied research on fuel cells, electrolyzers, and related technologies.
