= International Centre for Hydrogen Energy Technologies =

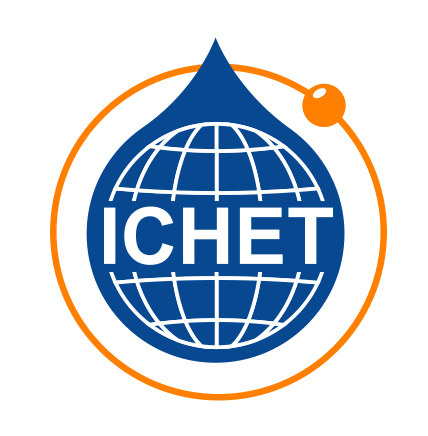
Emblem

The International Centre for Hydrogen Energy Technologies (ICHET) was a project of the United Nations Industrial Development Organization (UNIDO). Its role was to support, demonstrate and promote viable implementations of hydrogen energy technologies with the aims of enhancing future economic development, particularly in emerging countries. Founded through a Trust Fund Agreement signed between UNIDO and the Turkish Ministry of Energy and Natural Resources in 2003 in Vienna, ICHET started operation in 2004 and closed down in December 2012. For the rest of the 2010s hydrogen was hardly in Turkey’s energy policy.

== Sources ==
- Independent Mid-Term Review of the UNIDO Project: Establishment and operation of the International Centre for Hydrogen Energy Technologies (ICHET), TF/INT/03/002
- United Nations Industrial Development Organization - Europe and NIS Programme in Action 2009
