= Homogenizer =

Equipment used for the homogenization of various types of material

A homogenizer is a piece of laboratory or industrial equipment used for the homogenization of various types of material, such as tissue, plant, food, soil, and many others. Many different models have been developed using various physical technologies for disruption. The mortar and pestle, already used for thousands of years, is a standard tool even in modern laboratories. More modern solutions are based on blender type instruments, bead mills, ultrasonic treatment (also sonication), rotor-stator mechanical, high pressure, and many other physical forces. While there are many application overlaps between methods, each homogenization method has distinct advantages and disadvantages.

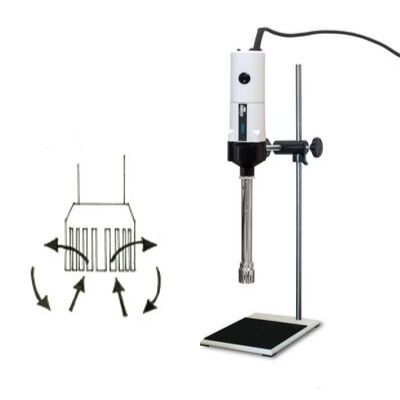
File:PRO Scientific Rotor Stator disperser homogenizer.jpg

There are often many different names for the same piece of mechanical homogenizing equipment, including Cell Lysor, Disperser, High Shear Mixer, Homogenizer, Polytron, Rotor Stator Homogenizer, Sonicator or Tissue Tearor.

Cell fractionation is done by homogenizer to release the organelles from cell. Whereas older technologies just focused on the disruption of the material, newer technologies also address quality or environmental aspects, such as cross-contamination, aerosols, risk of infection, or noise. Homogenization is a very common sample preparation step prior to the analysis of nucleic acids, proteins, cells, metabolism, pathogens, and many other targets.

== Frosted glass slides ==
As a simple alternative for mortar and pestle, frosted glass slides are used for homogenizing small and soft tissue specimens. Tissue specimen is homogenized in a small volume of appropriate buffer between corner areas of two frosted glass slides by circular movement; then homogenate is collected by a pipette.

== See also ==
- Homogenization (chemistry)
- French pressure cell press
- Cell disruption
- Ultrasonic homogenizer
