= Nanosphere =

Type of nanostructure

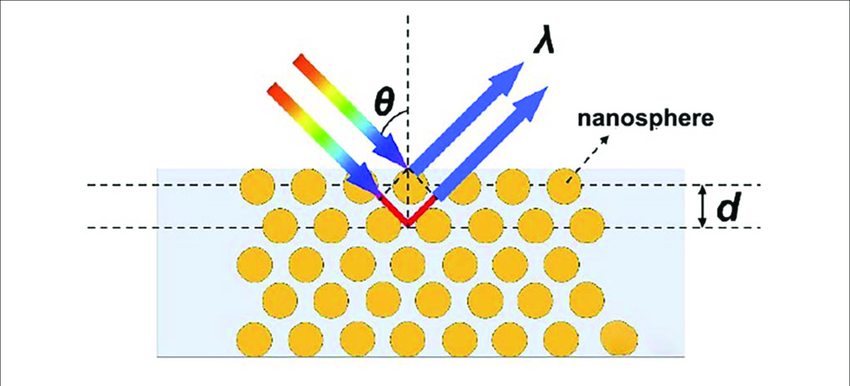
The diffraction mechanism of a photonic crystal composed of nanospheres.

Nanospheres are a type or class of nanostructure consisting of a solid core and matrix made from a polymeric material—both organic and inorganic are common. They are not necessarily spherical in shape. In a nanoengineering context, they are generally divided into two categories: magnetic nanospherers and immune nanospheres, and can range from 10 to 200 nm in size.

== Structure ==
Magnetic nanospheres are mostly inorganic and can be manipulated easily using a magnetic field. For their mass, they have very high surface area and saturation magnetisation. This means they have the potential to be used in a variety of ways, including: ion exchange separation, drug delivery, targeted gene therapy, and magnetic resonance imaging. They may be hollow and filled with molecules—such as anti-cancer drugs—for delivery, through a needle or otherwise, into the body. This delivery method can avoid much more invasive surgery and pores in the nanospheres allow them to effectively deliver cells or act as a microreactor.

Immune nanospheres are designed to induce an immune response—both adaptive and innate—by delivering specific nucleotides, such as CpG oligodeoxynucleotide, to the body. They may be designed to have enhanced dispersity and solubility.

== In nature ==
Nanospheres are found in the natural world, such as in the amelogenin proteins found in enamel in teeth and in photonic crystals found in some plants—edelweiss, for example.

== Bibliography ==
- Adki, Kaveri M.; Kulkarni, Yogesh A. (2020). "Chemistry, pharmacokinetics, pharmacology and recent novel drug delivery systems of paeonol". Life Sciences. 250 117544. doi:10.1016/j.lfs.2020.117544. ISSN 0024-3205. PMID 32179072.
- Kaeokhamloed, Norraseth; et al. (2022-09-01). "FRET as the tool for in vivo nanomedicine tracking". Journal of Controlled Release. 349: 156–173. doi:10.1016/j.jconrel.2022.06.048. ISSN 0168-3659. PMID 35779657.
- Subramani, Karthikeyan; et al. (2018), "Chapter 19 - Nanodiagnostics in microbiology and dentistry", in Subramani, Karthikeyan; et al. (eds.), Emerging Nanotechnologies in Dentistry (Second Edition), Micro and Nano Technologies, William Andrew Publishing, pp. 391–419, doi:10.1016/b978-0-12-812291-4.00019-4, ISBN 978-0-12-812291-4, PMC 7158274
- Sun, Jiyu; et al. (2013). "Structural coloration in nature". RSC Advances. 3 (35): 14862. Bibcode:2013RSCAd...314862S. doi:10.1039/C3RA41096J. ISSN 2046-2069.
- Verma, Gaurav; et al. (2017), "Nanoparticles: A Novel Approach to Target Tumors", Nano- and Microscale Drug Delivery Systems, Elsevier, pp. 113–129, doi:10.1016/b978-0-323-52727-9.00007-8, ISBN 978-0-323-52727-9
- Tai, Yulei; et al. (2011). "Recent research progress on the preparation and application of magnetic nanospheres". Polymer International. 60 (7): 976–994. doi:10.1002/pi.3078. ISSN 1097-0126.
- Zhang, Huijie; et al. (2015-08-24). "Polyethyleneimine-functionalized boron nitride nanospheres as efficient carriers for enhancing the immunostimulatory effect of CpG oligodeoxynucleotides". International Journal of Nanomedicine. 10 (1): 5343–5353. doi:10.2147/IJN.S88774. PMC 4554408. PMID 26346655.
