= Homogenization (chemistry) =

Chemical process

Homogenizing valve, a method to homogenize at high pressure

Homogenization or homogenisation is any of several processes used to make a mixture of two mutually non-soluble liquids the same throughout. This is achieved by turning one of the liquids into a state consisting of extremely small particles distributed uniformly throughout the other liquid. A typical example is the homogenization of milk, wherein the milk fat globules are reduced in size and dispersed uniformly through the rest of the milk.

== Definition ==
Homogenization (from "homogeneous;" Greek, homogenes: homos, same + genos, kind) is the process of converting two immiscible liquids (i.e. liquids that are not soluble, in all proportions, one in another) into an emulsion (Mixture of two or more liquids that are generally immiscible). Sometimes two types of homogenization are distinguished: primary homogenization, when the emulsion is created directly from separate liquids; and secondary homogenization, when the emulsion is created by the reduction in size of droplets in an existing emulsion. Homogenization is achieved by a mechanical device called a homogenizer.

== Application ==
One of the oldest applications of homogenization is in milk processing. It is normally preceded by "standardization" (the mixing of milk from several different herds or dairies to produce a more consistent raw milk prior to processing). The fat in milk normally separates from the water and collects at the top. Homogenization breaks the fat into smaller sizes so it no longer separates, allowing the sale of non-separating milk at any fat specification.

== Methods ==
Milk homogenization is accomplished by mixing large amounts of harvested milk, then forcing the milk at high pressure through small holes. Milk homogenization is an essential tool of the milk food industry to produce consistent levels of flavor and fat concentration.

Another application of homogenization is in soft drinks like cola products. The reactant mixture is rendered to intense homogenization, to as much as 35,000 psi, so that various constituents do not separate out during storage or distribution.

== See also ==
- Ultrasonic homogenizer
- French pressure cell press
- Homogenizer
- Cell disruption
