= Iron chloride =

Iron chloride may refer to:

- Iron(II) chloride (ferrous chloride, iron dichloride), FeCl_{2}
- Iron(III) chloride (ferric chloride, iron trichloride), FeCl_{3}
