= Sonication =

Application of sound energy

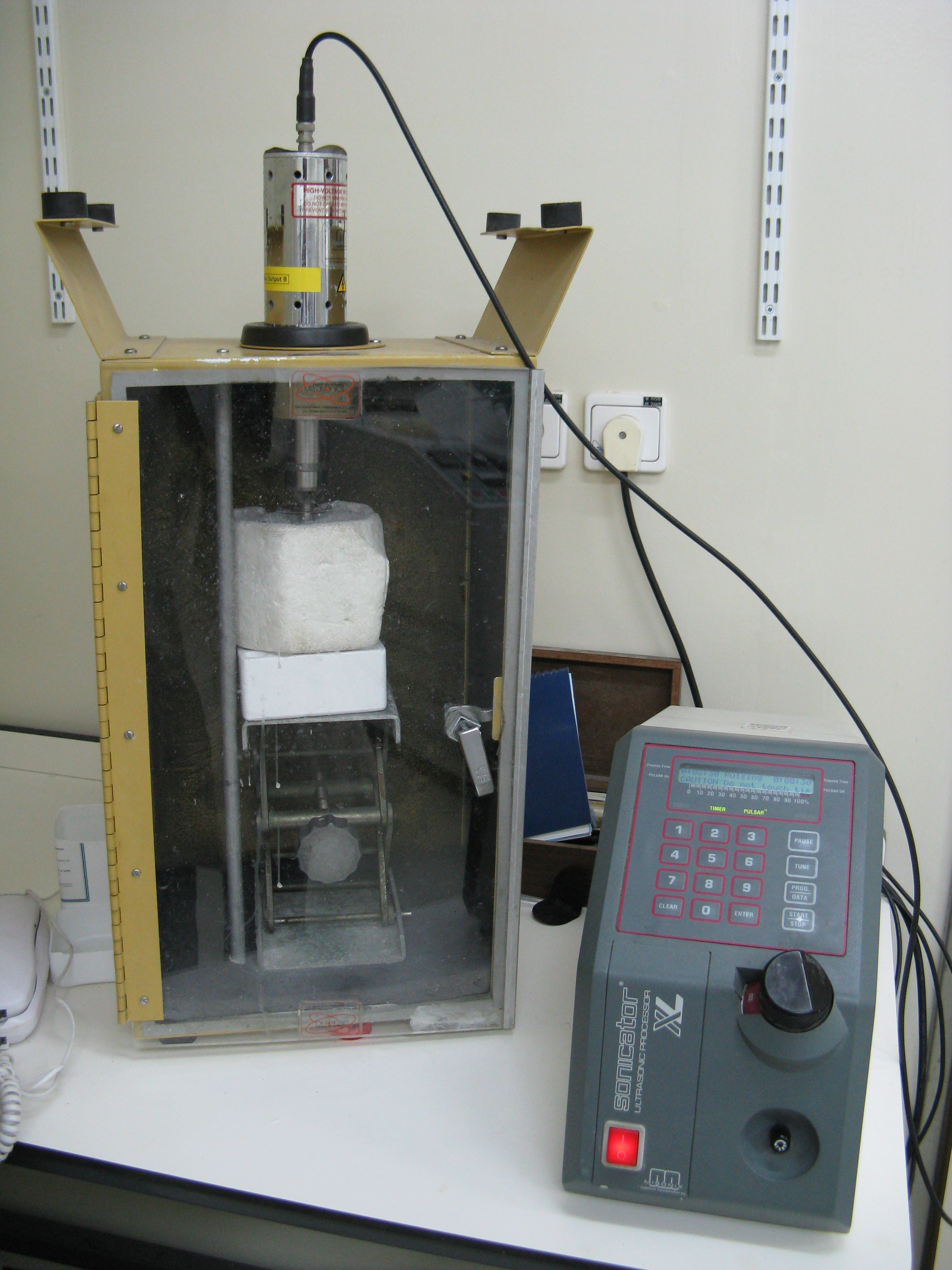
A sonicator at the Weizmann Institute of Science during sonication

Sonication is the act of applying sound energy to agitate particles in a sample, for various purposes such as the extraction of multiple compounds from plants, microalgae, and seaweeds. Ultrasonic frequencies (> 20 kHz) are usually used, leading to the process also being known as ultrasonication or ultra-sonication.

In the laboratory, it is usually applied using an ultrasonic bath or an ultrasonic probe, colloquially known as a sonicator. In a paper machine, an ultrasonic foil can distribute cellulose fibres more uniformly and strengthen the paper.

== Effects ==
Sonication has numerous effects, both chemical and physical. The scientific field concerned with understanding the effect of sonic waves on chemical systems is called sonochemistry. The chemical effects of ultrasound do not come from a direct interaction with molecular species. Studies have shown that no direct coupling of the acoustic field with chemical species on a molecular level can account for sonochemistry or sonoluminescence. Instead, in sonochemistry the sound waves migrate through a medium, inducing pressure variations and cavitations that grow and collapse, transforming the sound waves into mechanical energy.

== Applications ==
Sonication can be used for the production of nanoparticles such as nanoemulsions, nanocrystals, liposomes and wax emulsions, as well as for wastewater purification, degassing, extraction of seaweed polysaccharides and plant oil, extraction of anthocyanins and antioxidants, production of biofuels, crude oil desulfurization, cell disruption, polymer and epoxy processing, adhesive thinning, and many other processes. It is applied in pharmaceutical, cosmetic, water, food, ink, paint, coating, wood treatment, metalworking, nanocomposite, pesticide, fuel, wood product, and many other industries.

Sonication can be used to speed dissolution, by breaking intermolecular interactions. It is especially useful when it is not possible to stir the sample, as with NMR tubes. It may also be used to provide the energy for certain chemical reactions to proceed.

Sonication is used to remove dissolved gases from liquids (degassing) by sonicating the liquid while it is under a vacuum. This is an alternative to the freeze-pump-thaw and sparging methods.

In biological applications, sonication may be sufficient to disrupt or deactivate a biological material. For example, sonication is often used to disrupt cell membranes and release cellular contents. This process is called sonoporation. Small unilamellar vesicles (SUVs) can be made by sonication of a dispersion of large multilamellar vesicles (LMVs). Sonication is also used to fragment molecules of DNA, in which the DNA subjected to brief periods of sonication is sheared into smaller fragments.

Sonication is commonly used in nanotechnology for evenly dispersing nanoparticles in liquids. Additionally, it is used to break up aggregates of micron-sized colloidal particles.

Sonication can also be used to initiate crystallisation processes and even control polymorphic crystallisations. It is used to intervene in anti-solvent precipitations (crystallisation) to aid mixing and isolate small crystals.

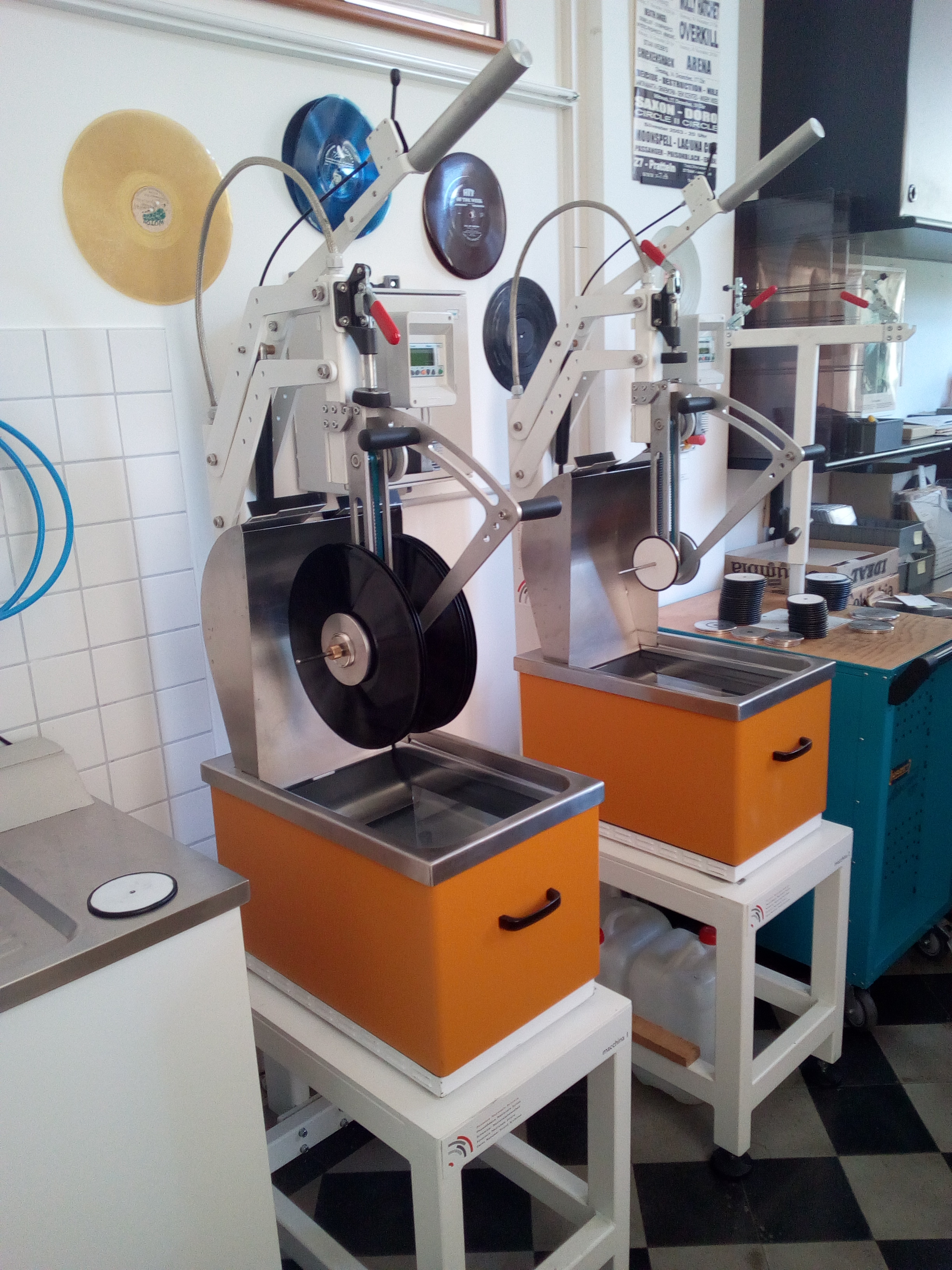
Sonication machines for record cleaning at Swiss National Sound Archives

Sonication is the mechanism used in ultrasonic cleaning—loosening particles adhering to surfaces. In addition to laboratory science applications, sonicating baths have applications including cleaning objects such as spectacles and jewelry.

Sonication is used in food industry as well. Main applications are for dispersion to save expensive emulgators (mayonnaise) or to speed up filtration processes (vegetable oil etc.). Experiments with sonication for artificial ageing of liquors and other alcoholic beverages were conducted.

Soil samples are often subjected to ultrasound in order to break up soil aggregates; this allows the study of the different constituents of soil aggregates (especially soil organic matter) without subjecting them to harsh chemical treatment.

Sonication is also used to extract microfossils from rock.

An ultrasonic bath or an ultrasonic probe system is used for extraction. For instance, this technique was suggested to remove isoflavones from soybeans and phenolic compounds from wheat bran and coconut shell powder. The outcomes differ for every raw material and solvent utilized and the other extraction techniques. Acoustic or ultrasonic cavitation is the basis for the operation of ultrasound-assisted extraction.

== Equipment ==
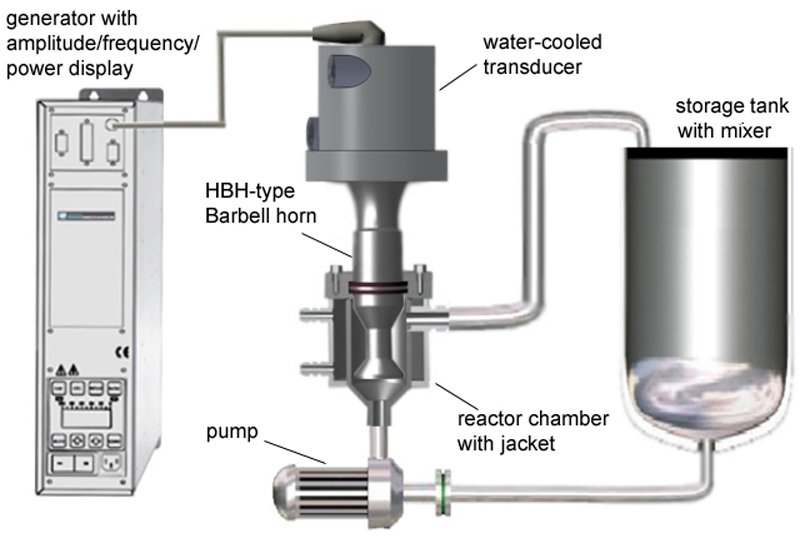
Schematic of bench and industrial-scale ultrasonic liquid processors

Substantial intensity of ultrasound and high ultrasonic vibration amplitudes are required for many processing applications, such as nano-crystallization, nano-emulsification, deagglomeration, extraction, cell disruption, as well as many others. Commonly, a process is first tested on a laboratory scale to prove feasibility and establish some of the required ultrasonic exposure parameters. After this phase is complete, the process is transferred to a pilot (bench) scale for flow-through pre-production optimization and then to an industrial scale for continuous production. During these scale-up steps, it is essential to make sure that all local exposure conditions (ultrasonic amplitude, cavitation intensity, time spent in the active cavitation zone, etc.) stay the same. If this condition is met, the quality of the final product remains at the optimized level, while the productivity is increased by a predictable "scale-up factor". The productivity increase results from the fact that laboratory-, bench-, and industrial-scale ultrasonic processor systems incorporate progressively larger ultrasonic horns, able to generate progressively larger high-intensity cavitation zones and, therefore, to process more material per unit of time. This is called "direct scalability". It is important to point out that increasing the power capacity of the ultrasonic processor alone does not result in direct scalability, since it may be (and frequently is) accompanied by a reduction in the ultrasonic amplitude and cavitation intensity. During direct scale-up, all processing conditions must be maintained, while the power rating of the equipment is increased in order to enable the operation of a larger ultrasonic horn. Finding the optimum operation condition for this equipment is a challenge for process engineers and needs deep knowledge about side effects of ultrasonic processors.

== See also ==
- Ultrasonics
- Ultrasonic cleaning
- Kenneth S. Suslick
