= Cresol Red =

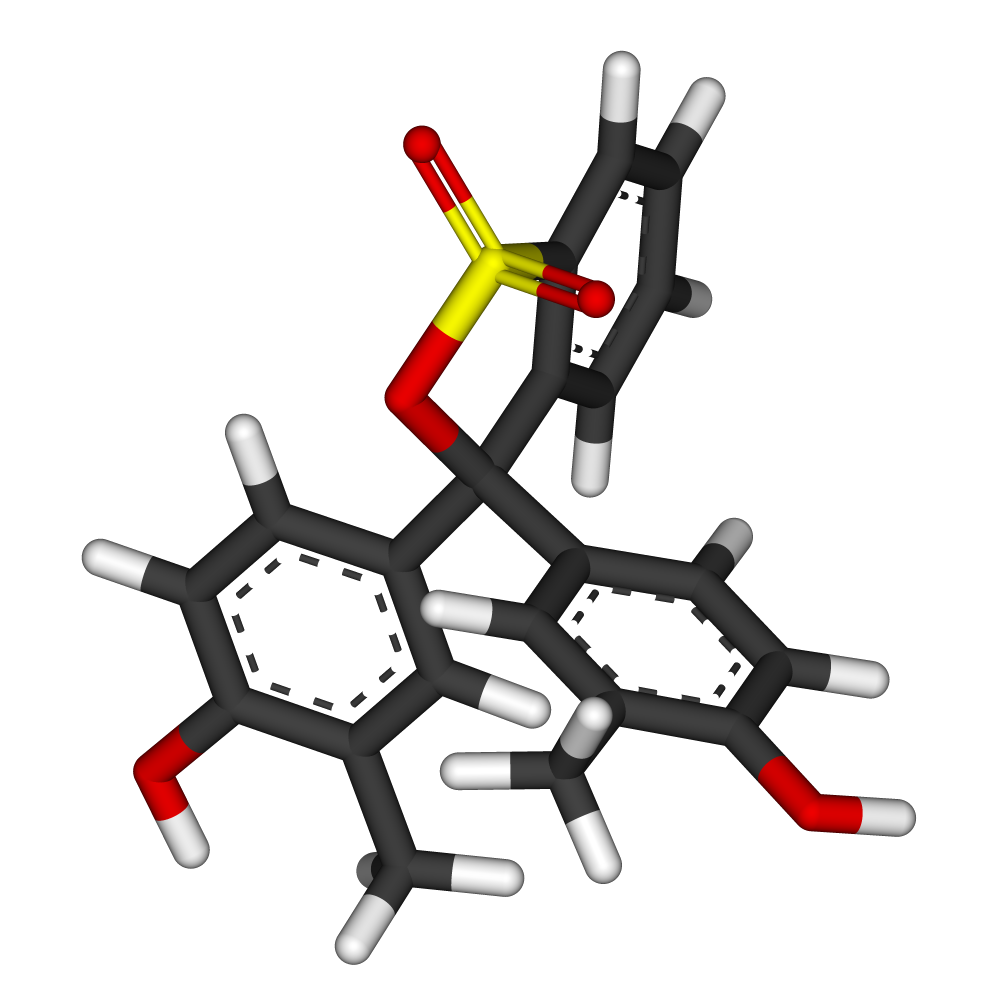

Names
- Preferred IUPAC name 3,3-Bis(4-hydroxy-3-methylphenyl)-2,1λ^{6}-benzoxathiole-1,1(3H)-dione

Identifiers
CAS Number	1733-12-6
3D model (JSmol)	Interactive image
ChEBI	CHEBI:86218
ChemSpider	65818
ECHA InfoCard	100.015.513
PubChem CID	73013
UNII	839K2R4B8K
CompTox Dashboard (EPA)	DTXSID8061929
- InChI: InChI=1S/C21H18O5S/c1-13-11-15(7-9-18(13)22)21(16-8-10-19(23)14(2)12-16)17-5-3-4-6-20(17)27(24,25)26-21/h3-12,22-23H,1-2H3 Key: OBRMNDMBJQTZHV-UHFFFAOYSA-N; InChI=1/C21H18O5S/c1-13-11-15(7-9-18(13)22)21(16-8-10-19(23)14(2)12-16)17-5-3-4-6-20(17)27(24,25)26-21/h3-12,22-23H,1-2H3 Key: OBRMNDMBJQTZHV-UHFFFAOYAD
- SMILES: Cc1cc(ccc1O)/C(=C/2C=CC(=O)C(=C2)C)c3ccccc3OS(O)=O

Properties
Chemical formula	C_{21}H_{17}NaO_{5}S
Molar mass	382.43 g/mol
- Except where otherwise noted, data are given for materials in their standard state (at 25 °C [77 °F], 100 kPa). verify (what is ?) Infobox references

Cresol red (full name: o-cresolsulfonephthalein) is a triarylmethane dye frequently used for monitoring the pH in aquaria.

Cresol red (pH indicator)
below pH 7.2		above pH 8.8
(yellow) 7.2	⇌	8.8 (purple)

== Molecular biology ==
Cresol red can be used in many common molecular biology reactions in place of other loading dyes. Cresol Red does not inhibit Taq polymerase to the same degree as other common loading dyes.

== Colour marker ==
Cresol red can also be used as an electrophoretic colour marker to monitor the process of agarose gel electrophoresis and polyacrylamide gel electrophoresis. In a 1% agarose gel, it runs approximately at the size of a 125 base pair (bp) DNA molecule (it depends on the concentration of buffer and other component). Bromophenol blue and xylene cyanol can also be used for this purpose.
