= Orange G =

Chemical compound and histologic stain

Names
- Other names Acid Orange 10; C.I. 16230

Identifiers
CAS Number	1936-15-8
3D model (JSmol)	Interactive image
ChEBI	CHEBI:82427
ChEMBL	ChEMBL410263; ChEMBL1615565
ChemSpider	10468647
ECHA InfoCard	100.016.096
KEGG	C19372
PubChem CID	9566064
UNII	1Q6EJU80RN
CompTox Dashboard (EPA)	DTXSID6021082
- InChI: InChI=1S/C16H12N2O7S2.2Na/c19-13-7-6-10-8-12(26(20,21)22)9-14(27(23,24)25)15(10)16(13)18-17-11-4-2-1-3-5-11;;/h1-9,19H,(H,20,21,22)(H,23,24,25);;/q;2*+1/p-2/b18-17+;; Key: HSXUHWZMNJHFRV-QIKYXUGXSA-L; InChI=1/C16H12N2O7S2.2Na/c19-13-7-6-10-8-12(26(20,21)22)9-14(27(23,24)25)15(10)16(13)18-17-11-4-2-1-3-5-11;;/h1-9,19H,(H,20,21,22)(H,23,24,25);;/q;2*+1/p-2/b18-17+;; Key: HSXUHWZMNJHFRV-JLAJEUQUBD
- SMILES: [Na+].[Na+].[O-]S(=O)(=O)c3cc2ccc(O)c(/N=N/c1ccccc1)c2c(c3)S([O-])(=O)=O

Properties
Chemical formula	C_{16}H_{10}N_{2}Na_{2}O_{7}S_{2}
Molar mass	452.38 g/mol
Melting point	141 °C

Hazards
- Occupational safety and health (OHS/OSH)
Main hazards	R36/37/38, S26, S36
- Except where otherwise noted, data are given for materials in their standard state (at 25 °C [77 °F], 100 kPa). verify (what is ?) Infobox references

Orange G also called C.I. 16230, Acid Orange 10, or orange gelb is a synthetic azo dye used in histology in many staining formulations. It usually comes as a disodium salt. It has the appearance of orange crystals or powder.

== Staining ==
Orange G is used in the Papanicolaou stain to stain keratin. It is also a major component of the Alexander test for pollen staining.

It is often combined with other yellow dyes and used to stain erythrocytes in the trichrome methods.

== Color marker ==
Orange G can be used as an electrophoretic color marker to monitor the process of agarose gel electrophoresis, running approximately at the size of a 50 base pair (bp) DNA molecule, and polyacrylamide gel electrophoresis. Bromophenol blue and xylene cyanol can also be used for this purpose. (However, the apparent "size" of all these dyes varies according to the concentration of agarose in the gel and the buffer system used, so one should look up the appropriate reference before using the dyes to determine how far a gel has run.)

== pH indicator ==
Despite its three ionizable groups, it shows only two colors in aqueous solution, brilliant orange in neutral and acidic pH or red in pH greater than nine.
