= Xylene cyanol =

Dye used as an electrophoretic color marker

Names
- Preferred IUPAC name Sodium 4-{(Z)-[3-methyl-4-(ethylamino)phenyl][3-methyl-4-(ethylimino)cyclohexa-2,5-dien-1-ylidene]methyl}-3-sulfobenzene-1-sulfonate
- Other names Acid Blue 147 xylene cyanole xylene cyanol FF xylene cyanole FF; C.I. 42135

Identifiers
CAS Number	2650-17-1
3D model (JSmol)	Interactive image
ChemSpider	21106494
ECHA InfoCard	100.018.334
EC Number	220-167-5
PubChem CID	44135495
CompTox Dashboard (EPA)	DTXSID20883877
- InChI: InChI=1S/C25H28N2O6S2.Na/c1-5-26-22-11-7-18(13-16(22)3)25(19-8-12-23(27-6-2)17(4)14-19)21-10-9-20(32-34(28)29)15-24(21)33-35(30)31;/h7-15,26H,5-6H2,1-4H3,(H,28,29)(H,30,31);/q;+1/p-1/b25-19-,27-23-; Key: NLIVDORGVGAOOJ-KRQUPCAFSA-M; InChI=1S/C25H28N2O6S2.Na/c1-5-26-22-11-7-18(13-16(22)3)25(19-8-12-23(27-6-2)17(4)14-19)21-10-9-20(32-34(28)29)15-24(21)33-35(30)31;/h7-15,26H,5-6H2,1-4H3,(H,28,29)(H,30,31);/q;+1/p-1/b25-19-,27-23-; Key: NLIVDORGVGAOOJ-KRQUPCAFSA-M
- SMILES: [Na+].CCNc1ccc(cc1C)/C(=C2/C=C\C(=[NH+]\CC)C(=C2)C)c3ccc(OS([O-])=O)cc3OS([O-])=O

Properties
Chemical formula	C_{25}H_{27}N_{2}NaO_{6}S_{2}
Molar mass	538.61 g·mol^{−1}

Hazards
- GHS labelling
Pictograms	(GHS07: Exclamation mark)
Signal word	Warning
Hazard statements	H315, H319, H335
Precautionary statements	P261, P264, P271, P280, P302+P352, P304+P340, P305+P351+P338, P312, P321, P332+P313, P337+P313, P362, P403+P233, P405, P501
- Except where otherwise noted, data are given for materials in their standard state (at 25 °C [77 °F], 100 kPa). verify (what is ?) Infobox references

Xylene cyanol can be used as an electrophoretic color marker, or tracking dye, to monitor the process of agarose gel electrophoresis and polyacrylamide gel electrophoresis. Bromophenol blue and orange G can also be used for this purpose.

Once mixed with the sample, the concentration of xylene cyanol is typically about 0.005% to 0.03%.

== Migration speed ==
In 1% agarose gels, xylene cyanol migrates at about the same rate as a 4 to 5 kilobase pair DNA fragment, although this depends on the buffer used. Xylene cyanol on a 6% polyacrylamide gel migrates at the speed of a 140 base pair DNA fragment. On 20% denaturating (7 M urea) polyacrylamide gel electrophoresis (PAGE), xylene cyanol migrates at about the rate of 25 bases oligonucleotide.
