= GelRed =

DNA gel stain for molecular genetics

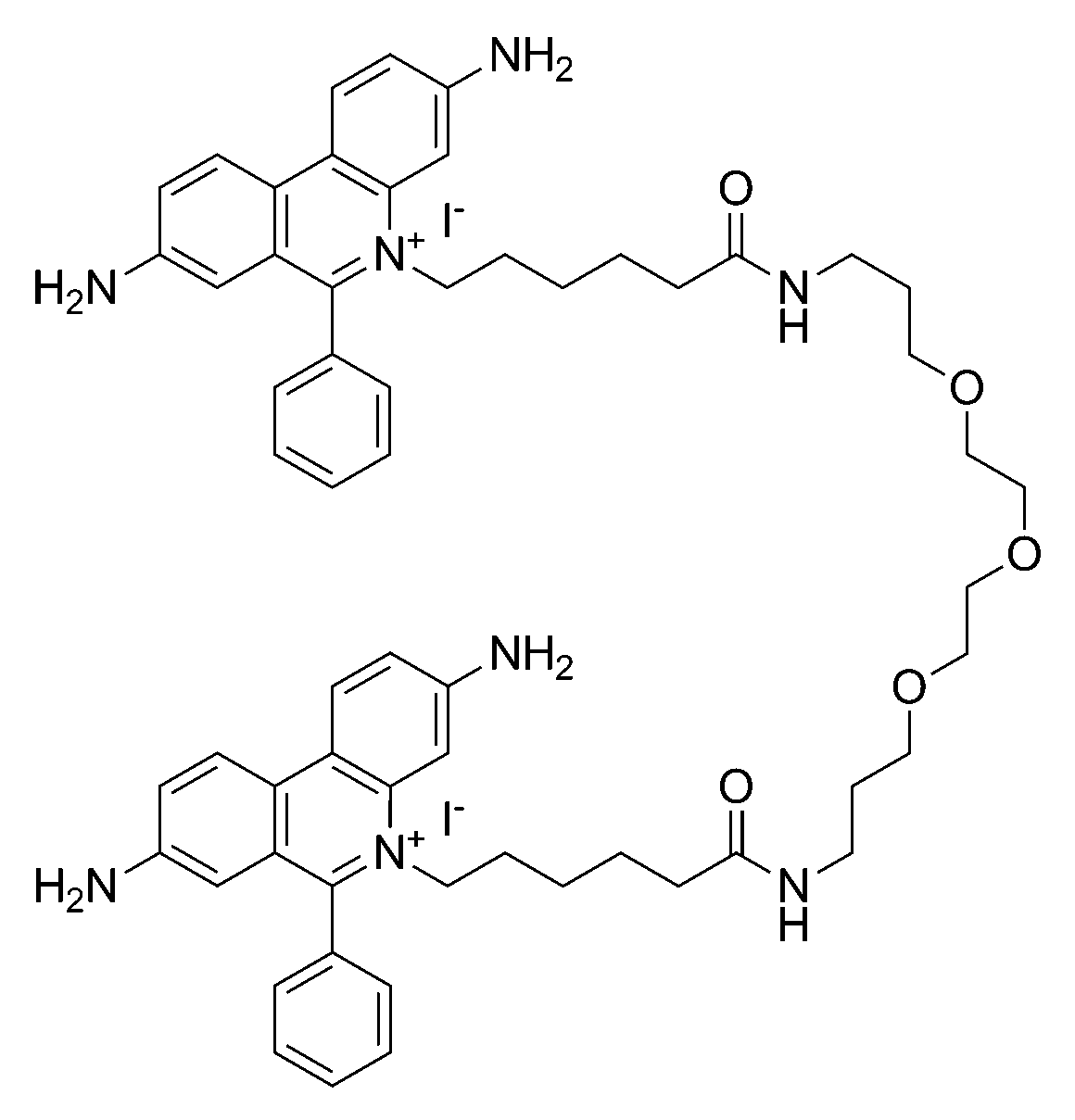

Names
- Preferred IUPAC name 5,5′-(6,22-Dioxo-11,14,17-trioxa-7,21-diazaheptacosane-1,27-diyl)bis(3,8-diamino-6-phenylphenanthridin-5-ium) diiodide
- Other names Dye No. 35, ET-27

Identifiers
3D model (JSmol)	Interactive image
ChemSpider	129556851
PubChem CID	117700725
CompTox Dashboard (EPA)	DTXSID701030499
- InChI: InChI=1S/C60H70N8O5.2HI/c61-45-21-25-49-51-27-23-47(63)41-55(51)67(59(53(49)39-45)43-15-5-1-6-16-43)31-11-3-9-19-57(69)65-29-13-33-71-35-37-73-38-36-72-34-14-30-66-58(70)20-10-4-12-32-68-56-42-48(64)24-28-52(56)50-26-22-46(62)40-54(50)60(68)44-17-7-2-8-18-44;;/h1-2,5-8,15-18,21-28,39-42,63-64H,3-4,9-14,19-20,29-38,61-62H2,(H2,65,66,69,70);2*1H Key: JGBUYEVOKHLFID-UHFFFAOYSA-N
- SMILES: c1ccccc1-c2c3cc(N)ccc3c4ccc(N)cc4[n+]2CCCCCC(=O)NCCCOCCOCCOCCCNC(=O)CCCCC[n+]5c6cc(N)ccc6c7ccc(N)cc7c5-c8ccccc8.[I-].[I-]

Properties
Chemical formula	C_{60}H_{72}I_{2}N_{8}O_{5}
Molar mass	1239.07 g/mol

Hazards
NFPA 704 (fire diamond)	0 0 0
Flash point	> 100 °C (212 °F; 373 K)
Safety data sheet (SDS)	10,000X in water, Biotium Inc.
- Except where otherwise noted, data are given for materials in their standard state (at 25 °C [77 °F], 100 kPa). Infobox references

GelRed is an intercalating nucleic acid stain used in molecular genetics for agarose gel DNA electrophoresis. GelRed structurally consists of two ethidium subunits that are bridged by a linear oxygenated spacer.

GelRed is a fluorophore, and its optical properties are essentially identical to those of ethidium bromide. When exposed to ultraviolet light, it fluoresces with an orange color that strongly intensifies after binding to DNA. The substance is marketed as a less toxic and more sensitive alternative to ethidium bromide. GelRed is sold as a solution in anhydrous DMSO or ultrapurified water. One benefit of using GelRed instead of EtBr, is that GelRed is unable to cross cell membranes. This is caused by the chemical structure of GelRed, being a large, charged molecule, which doesn't permit it to penetrate the cell membrane, which greatly reduces the risks of mutations. This makes it not toxic to living cells, and a better choice as a fluorescent dye.

== See also ==
- Ethidium bromide
- GelGreen
- SYBR Green I
- Gel electrophoresis
- Phenanthridine
- Molecular genetics
