= Bromophenol blue =

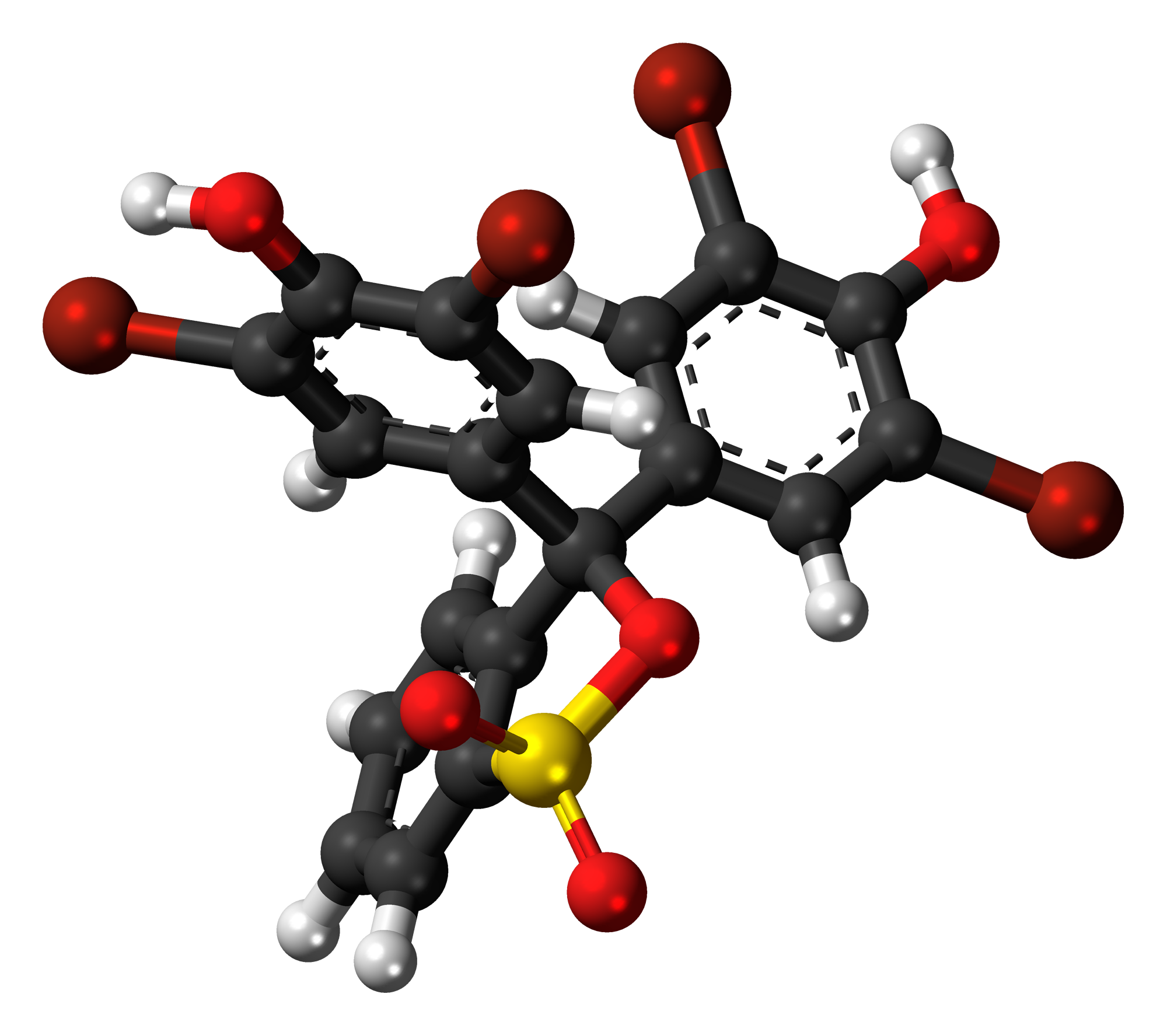

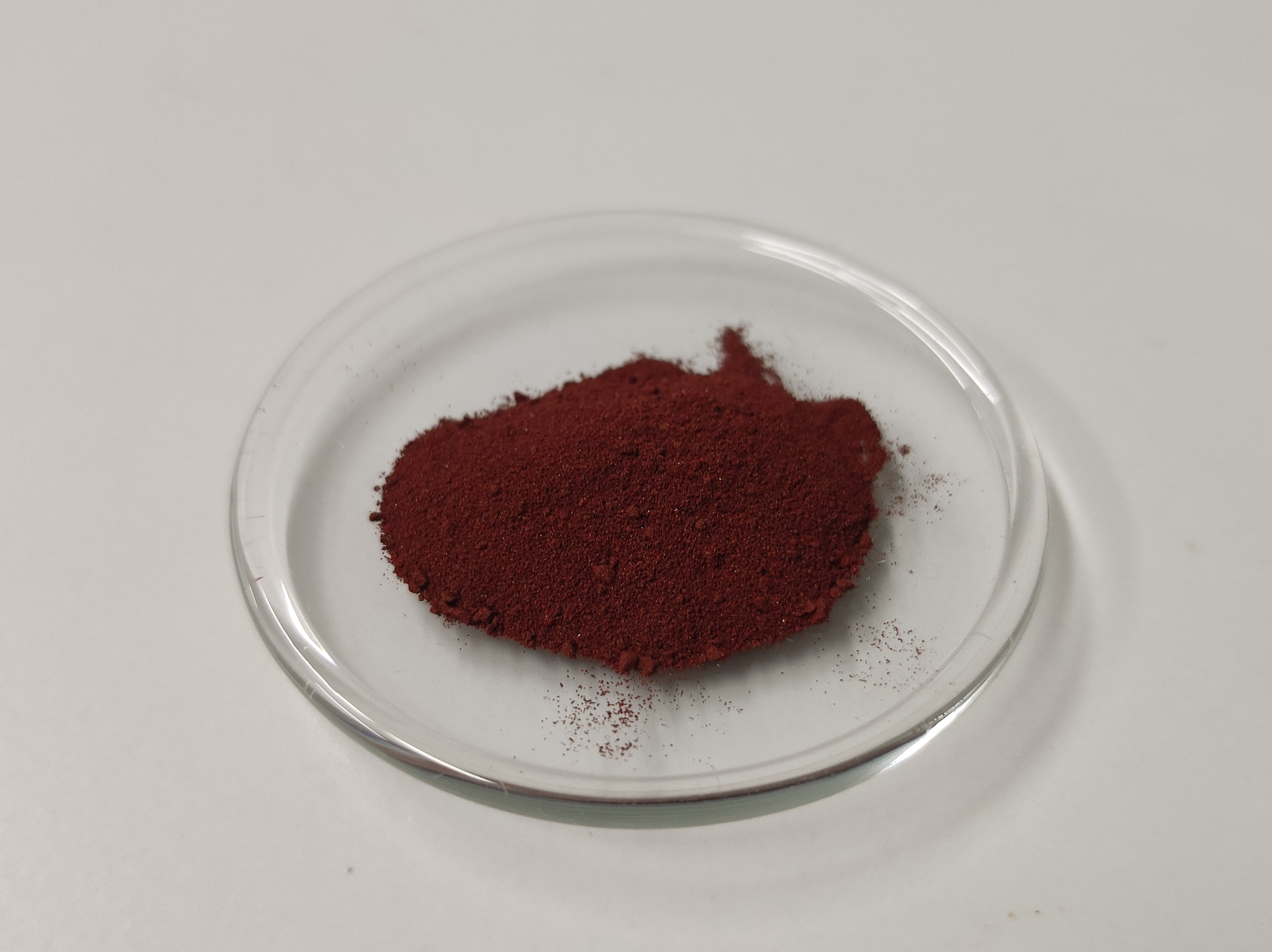

Names
- Preferred IUPAC name 3,3-Bis(3,5-dibromo-4-hydroxyphenyl)-2,1λ^{6}-benzoxathiole-1,1(3H)-dione

Identifiers
CAS Number	115-39-9; 34725-61-6 (sodium salt)
3D model (JSmol)	Interactive image
ChEBI	CHEBI:59424
ChEMBL	ChEMBL2103765
ChemSpider	7973
ECHA InfoCard	100.003.715
PubChem CID	8272
UNII	0R2969YC90
CompTox Dashboard (EPA)	DTXSID6041682
- InChI: InChI=1S/C19H10Br4O5S/c20-12-5-9(6-13(21)17(12)24)19(10-7-14(22)18(25)15(23)8-10)11-3-1-2-4-16(11)29(26,27)28-19/h1-8,24-25H Key: UDSAIICHUKSCKT-UHFFFAOYSA-N; InChI=1/C19H10Br4O5S/c20-12-5-9(6-13(21)17(12)24)19(10-7-14(22)18(25)15(23)8-10)11-3-1-2-4-16(11)29(26,27)28-19/h1-8,24-25H Key: UDSAIICHUKSCKT-UHFFFAOYAE
- SMILES: Brc1cc(cc(Br)c1O)C3(OS(=O)(=O)c2ccccc23)c4cc(Br)c(O)c(Br)c4

Properties
Chemical formula	C_{19}H_{10}Br_{4}O_{5}S
Molar mass	669.96 g·mol^{−1}
Odor	odorless
Density	2.2 g/mL
Melting point	273 °C (523 °F; 546 K) (decomposes)
Acidity (pK_{a})	4.0
- Except where otherwise noted, data are given for materials in their standard state (at 25 °C [77 °F], 100 kPa). verify (what is ?) Infobox references

Bromophenol blue (3′,3″,5′,5″-tetrabromophenolsulfonphthalein, BPB), also known as albutest, is used as a pH indicator, an electrophoretic color marker, and a dye. It can be prepared by slowly adding excess bromine to a hot solution of phenolsulfonphthalein in glacial acetic acid.

== Acid–base indicator ==
Bromophenol blue (pH indicator)
below pH 3.5		above pH 4.6
3.5	⇌	4.6

As an acid–base indicator, its useful range lies between pH 3.0 and 4.6. It changes from yellow at pH 3.0 to blue at pH 4.6; this reaction is reversible. Bromophenol blue is structurally related to phenolphthalein (a popular indicator).

== Color marker ==
Bromophenol is also used as a colour marker to monitor the process of agarose gel electrophoresis and polyacrylamide gel electrophoresis. Since bromophenol blue carries a slight negative charge at moderate pH, it will migrate in the same direction as DNA or protein in a gel; the rate at which it migrates varies according to gel density and buffer composition, but in a typical 1% agarose gel in a 1X TAE buffer or TBE buffer, bromophenol blue migrates at the same rate as a DNA fragment of about 300 base pairs, in 2% agarose as 150 bp. Xylene cyanol and orange G may also be used for this purpose.

== Dye ==
Bromophenol blue is also used as a dye. At neutral pH, the dye absorbs red light most strongly and transmits blue light. (Its peak absorbance is 590 nm at a basic pH of 12.) Solutions of the dye, therefore, are blue. At low pH, the dye absorbs ultraviolet and blue light most strongly and appears yellow in solution. In solution at pH 3.6 (in the middle of the transition range of this pH indicator) obtained by dissolution in water without any pH adjustment, bromophenol blue has a characteristic green red colour, where the apparent colour shifts depending on the concentration and/or path length through which the solution is observed. This phenomenon is called dichromatic color. Bromophenol blue is the substance with the highest known value of Kreft's dichromaticity index. This means it has the largest change in colour hue, when the thickness or concentration of observed sample increases or decreases.

== See also ==
- Bromophenol
