= Martin Medal =

The Martin Medal is an award given for outstanding contributions to the advancement of separation science. The award is presented by The Chromatographic Society, a UK-based organization promoting all aspects of chromatography and related separation techniques. The award is named after Professor Archer J.P Martin, who contributed to the invention of partition chromatography, and shared the 1952 Nobel Prize in Chemistry.

== Award winners ==
Past winners of the Martin Medal are:

- Robert Kennedy (2019)
- Jean-Luc Veuthey (2018)
- Andreas Manz (2017)
- Ian Wilson & Peter Myers (2016)
- Pavel Jandera (2015)
- Nobuo Tanaka (2014)
- Günther Bonn & Frantisek Svec (2013)
- Edward S. Yeung (2012)
- Peter J. Schoenmakers (2011)
- Peter Carr (2010)
- Wolfgang F. Lindner (2009)
- Ron Majors & Johan Roeraade (2007)
- Jim Waters (2006)
- Vadim A. Davankov (2005)
- Terry Berger (2004)
- Jack Henion (2003)
- Paul R. Haddad & Werner Engewald (2002)
- John Michael Ramsey (2001)
- Klaus Mosbach & William S. Hancock (2000)
- Hans Poppe & Geoffrey Eglinton, FRS (1999)
- Albert Zlatkis (1998, awarded posthumously)
- Will Jennings & Joseph Jack Kirkland (1997)
- Milton L. Lee (1996)
- Milos Novotny & Shigeru Terabe (1995)
- Pat Sandra & Csaba Horvath (1994)
- Hans Engelhardt, Fred E. Regnier, & Klaus K. Unger (1993)
- Irving Wainer & James W. Jorgenson (1992)
- Dai E. Games, Barry L. Karger, Daniel W. Armstrong, & Dennis H. Desty (1991)
- Egil Jellum, William Pirkle, & Carl A. Cramers (1990)
- Jon Calvin Giddings, Udo. A Th Brinkman, J. F. K. Huber, Rudolf E. Kaiser, & Lloyd R. Snyder (1986)
- Ervin Kovats & John Knox (1985)
- C. E. Roland Jones & Arnaldo L. Liberti (1984)
- Gerhard Schomburg & Ralph Stock (1983)
- Edward R. Adlard, Leslie S. Ettre, Courtney S. G. Phillips, & Raymond P. W. Scott (1982)
- G. A. Peter Tuey & Georges Guiochon (1980)
- Ernst Bayer & C. E. H. Knapman (1978)
