= Righetti =

Righetti is an Italian language surname. Notable people with the surname include:

- Alex Righetti (born 1977), Italian former basketball player
- Amanda Righetti (born 1983), American actress and film producer
- Caryl Righetti (born 1984), Swiss footballer
- Dave Righetti (born 1958), American baseball coach and former player, son of Leo Righetti
- Francesco Righetti, also known in Spanish as Francisco Righetti (1835–1917), Swiss architect
- Geltrude Righetti (1793–1862), Italian opera singer
- Joe Righetti (born 1947), former American football player
- Leo Righetti (1925–1998), American baseball player, father of Dave Righetti
- Mario Righetti (born c. 1590), Italian painter
- Mattia Righetti (born 1980), Italian rower
- Oscar Righetti (born 1948), retired Italian footballer
- Pier Giorgio Righetti (born 1941), Italian chemist
- Pietro Righetti (1899–2001), Italian racing cyclist
- Samuele Righetti (born 2001), Italian footballer
- Timo Righetti (born 1998), Swiss footballer
- Ubaldo Righetti (born 1963), Italian footballer

== See also ==
- Ernest Righetti High School, one of the four primary high schools of the Santa Maria Joint Union High School District in California.
- Palazzo Orsini Pio Righetti, a palace in Rome
