= Walter Jennings =

Walter Jennings may refer to:

- Walter Jennings (chemist) (1922–2012), American academic, chemist and entrepreneur
- Walter Jennings (footballer) (1897–1970), English footballer
- Wally Jennings (Walter Henry Jennings, 1909–1993), English footballer
- Walter Jennings (industrialist) (1858–1933), American industrialist and art collector
- Walter Jennings (politician) (1864–1942), Newfoundland politician and fisherman
- Dr. Walter Jennings, a fictional character in the movie Sky Captain and the World of Tomorrow
