= Pier Giorgio Righetti =

Italian chemist

- Born: 25 April 1941 (age 85); Forlì, Emilia-Romagna, Italy
- Education: University of Pavia; Massachusetts Institute of Technology; Harvard Medical School
- Known for: Methods and techniques for electrophoresis
- Spouse: Adriana Bianchi Bosisio
- Scientific career
- Fields: Proteomics
- Workplaces: University of Milan; Polytechnic University of Milan

Pier Giorgio Righetti (born 25 April 1941) is a professor emeritus of chemistry. He worked primarily at the University of Milan (1971–1995) and at the Department of Chemistry of the Polytechnic University of Milan (2005–2011). He has served as the President of the Società Italiana di Proteomica (Italian Proteome Society, IPSo).

A special issue of Electrophoresis was published in Righetti's honor in 2006, recognizing his work developing new methods and techniques for electrophoresis. His contributions have been described as "paramount in the ability to separate biomolecules electrophoretically". Righetti uses those techniques to study proteomes, sets of proteins that are expressed in organisms. He focuses particularly on animals and foods. Proteomics describes the proteins that can exist in a given type of cell and their interactions, form and structure. Proteins can remain intact for hundreds or even thousands of years. One of many applications of Righetti's techniques is the study of historical artefacts, analyzing minute amounts of protein left on them to learn more about their owners and the conditions under which they were used.

== Education and career ==
Righetti attended the University of Pavia in Italy, from which he received a Ph.D. in Organic Chemistry in 1965. He also did compulsory military service in the Mountain Artillery. Between 1966 and 1970 he held postdoctoral positions: first at Massachusetts Institute of Technology for three years and then at Harvard Medical School for one year, where he studied electrophoresis with James W. Drysdale. They developed techniques for isoelectric focusing (IEF) using soluble carrier ampholytes and polyacrylamide gels.

In 1971, Righetti accepted a position at the University of Milan as a professor of biochemistry. He remained there for the next 24 years. He then worked for two years at the University of Calabria with Roberto Bartolino, and for another eight years at the University of Verona with Franco Tagliaro and Mahmud Hamdan. Finally, he returned to Milan to work at the Polytechnic University of Milan, where he established a proteomics lab. He became professor emeritus at age seventy, under mandatory retirement laws.

Righetti has consulted with NASA, the European Space Agency and the Italian Space Agency on experiments in microgravity.

== Research ==
External videos
- "The Monkey King: a personal view of the long journey towards a proteomic Nirvana", Pier Giorgio Righetti, 2014

In 2012, Righetti was awarded the 2012 Beckman Award for "outstanding career achievement in the field of electrodriven separations and technologies with particular consideration given to developments of new methods and techniques in electrophoresis." The methodologies that Righetti developed include isoelectric focusing in soluble buffers and immobilized pH gradients; multicompartment electrolyzers for isoelectric membranes and membrane‐trapped enzyme reactors, and temperature‐programmed capillary zone electrophoresis (CZE). In 2017, researchers stated "The work of P.G. Righetti has been paramount in the ability to separate biomolecules electrophoretically, particularly according to isoelectric point."

Righetti has published more than 750 papers, with an H-index of 60. He has created 10 patents and written 11 books. Several of his works are considered classic sources for electrophoretic methods. Righetti was closely involved with the journal Electrophoresis (founded 1980), and its sister journal Proteomics (founded 2001). He served as a member of the editorial board of Electrophoresis from its founding by Bertold J. Radola onwards. He has also worked on the editorial boards of the Journal of Chromatography, the Journal of Capillary Electrophoresis, the Journal of Biochemical and Biophysical Methods, BioTechniques, and the Journal of Proteomics.

He has served as the President of the Società Italiana di Proteomica (Italian Proteome Society, IPSo).

== Applications ==
Righetti has applied his methods to biomedical and clinical problems, including the study of haemoglobin and the development of neonatal screening for the inherited blood disorder Beta thalassemia. His work on immobilized pH gradients led to pioneering mapping of human proteins using two-dimensional gel electrophoresis. His multicompartment electrolyzer (MCE) for purifying proteins using amphoteric buffering membranes has been used for pre-fractionation in proteome analysis. His work on capillary zone electrophoresis (CZE) supports the identification of DNA point mutations. He has been involved in the development of large hexapeptide libraries for the identification of unique protein sequences, and in combinatorial peptide ligand capture.

Beginning in 2011, Righetti's methods have also been used for the examination of historical artefacts. In 2011, Righetti was asked by Alberto Melloni to determine the composition of a Bible, believed to have belonged to the Italian explorer Marco Polo in 1271. After four centuries in Shangdu, China, the Bible was given to Cosimo III de' Medici, Grand Duke of Tuscany, in 1685, and became part of the holdings of the Laurentian Library in Florence, Italy. Fragmented into almost ten thousand pieces, the bible was slated for conservation. The ultrathin sheets of parchment, barely 80 microns thick, were suspected to be made from the skin of lamb fetuses. A team led by Lucia Toniolo examined a fragment from the manuscript, microwaving it, dissolving it with trypsin, and purifying it. They identified eight proteins from the genus Bos taurus indicative of calf tissue. They suggested that the parchment dated to southern France before 1250 and was likely a livre de poche, or pocket Bible, produced by scribes at the University of Paris.

Next, Righetti sought to develop non-invasive techniques for analyzing the proteins left on manuscripts and diaries. In 2015, he, Gleb Zilberstein and others reported an analysis of pages from an original manuscript by Mikhail Bulgakov: Master and Margarita. They used resin beads, which were placed on the page to extract proteins. From the margins of the manuscript, the team detected protein biomarkers indicative of kidney disease and the painkiller morphine. Bulgakov finished the novel a few weeks before he died of an inherited kidney disorder.

When it was suggested that the beads might cause damage, Righetti, Zilberstein, Alfonsina d'Amato and others immobilized them within diskettes of ethylene-vinyl acetate (EVA) film, which is used to lift acids and proteins during manuscript preservation. Inspired by The Betrothed, Alessandro Manzoni's account of the Great Plague of Milan, a devastating 1630 outbreak of bubonic plague in which nearly half the population died, the researchers examined the city's death registries. They found evidence of proteins from the plague bacterium, Yersinia pestis, rat droppings, and corn, rice, carrots, and chickpeas, suggesting that the scribes ate their lunches at their desks. There were also indications that sheep and goats may have been housed in the lazaretto near the sick.

In 2017, Righetti, Zilberstein, d'Amato and others analyzed five letters and a blood-stained shirt that was worn by Anton Chekhov as he died. The researchers used beads in EVA films to collect proteins. Then they extracted and purified them and used liquid chromatography and mass spectrometry to analyze the results. They found traces of spittle, saliva, 108 proteins found in human blood, and proteins characteristic of Mycobacterium tuberculosis, from which Chekhov was known to have suffered. Unexpectedly, they also found ITIH4, a protein associated with blood clots. Their results open up the possibility that the immediate cause of Chekhov's death may have been a stroke.

== Books ==
Titles include:

- Boschetti, E.; Righetti, P. G. (2013). Low-Abundance Proteome Discovery; State of the Art and Protocols. Amsterdam: Elsevier.
- Hamdan, Mahmoud; Righetti, Pier Giorgio (2005). Proteomics today: protein assessment and biomarkers using mass spectrometry, 2D electrophoresis, and microarray technology. Hoboken, N.J.: John Wiley & Sons.
- Righetti, Pier Giorgio; Stoyanov, Alexander; Zhukov, Mikhail Y. (2001). The proteome revisited: theory and practice of all relevant electrophoretic steps. New York: Elsevier Science.
- Righetti, Pier Giorgio, ed. (1996). Capillary electrophoresis in analytical biotechnology. Boca Raton: CRC Press.
- Righetti, P. G. (1990). Immobilized pH Gradients: Theory and Methodology. Amsterdam: Elsevier.
- Righetti, P. G. (1983). Isoelectric focusing: theory, methodology, and applications. 1st ed. Laboratory techniques in biochemistry and molecular biology. Amsterdam; New York: Elsevier Biomedical Press.
- Righetti, P. G.; Van Oss, C. J.; Vanderhoff, J. W., eds. (1979). Electrokinetic separation methods. Amsterdam; New York: Elsevier / North-Holland Biomedical Press.
- Righetti, P. G.; Drysdale, J. W. (1976). Isoelectric focusing. New York: American Elsevier Pub. Co.

== Awards ==
- 2014, AES Lifetime Achievement Award, AES Electrophoresis Society
- 2014, Distinguished Achievement in Proteomic Sciences Award, Human Proteome Organization (HUPO)
- 2012, Inaugural Beckman Award, at the Microscale Bioseparation Symposium, c/o Beckman‐Coulter, Inc.
- 2011, Honorary member of the Spanish Proteomics Society
- 2008, Csaba Horvath Medal (also given to Barry L. Karger), Connecticut Separation Science Council, Yale University
- 2006, CaSSS Award (also given to Walter Jennings), California Separation Science Society
- 2006, Special issue of Electrophoresis, published in Righetti's honor
- 1999, Hirai Prize (also given to Julio Enrique Celis), Japanese Electrophoresis Society
- 1997, Milano Award for advanced genetic research in mutational analysis, ATB'97 Conference, Milano, November-1997
- 1997, Prize of the English Electrophoresis Society, Seattle Meeting of the International Electrophoresis Society
- 1995, Biotechnologist of the Year, Consorzio Italiano di Biotecnologie (CIB)
