= Journal of Chromatography =

Journal of Chromatography may refer to:

- Journal of Chromatography A
- Journal of Chromatography B
