= Hobart Hurd Willard =

American chemist (1881–1974)

- Born: June 3, 1881; Erie, Pennsylvania, U.S.
- Died: May 7, 1974 (aged 92); Ann Arbor, Michigan, U.S.
- Education: University of Michigan; Harvard University
- Scientific career
- Fields: Analytical chemistry
- Workplaces: University of Michigan
- Thesis: A revision of the atomic weights of silver, lithium, and chlorine (1909)
- Doctoral advisor: Theodore William Richards
- Notable students: G. Frederick Smith

Hobart Hurd Willard (June 3, 1881 – May 7, 1974) was an analytical chemist and inorganic chemist who spent most of his career at the University of Michigan. He was known for his teaching skill and his authorship of widely used textbooks. His research interests were wide-ranging and involved the characterization of perchloric acid and periodic acid salts.

== Early life and education ==
Willard was born on June 3, 1881, in Erie, Pennsylvania. His family relocated to Union City, Michigan, in 1883 and he spent the rest of his early life there. His father and later his high school teachers encouraged his interest in chemistry, which he pursued as an undergraduate at the University of Michigan. He received his A.B. in 1903 and his M.A. in 1905. Meanwhile, he was briefly hired as an instructor of chemistry, but at the encouragement of coworkers he decided to pursue his Ph.D. at Harvard University. He received his Ph.D. in 1909 under the supervision of Theodore William Richards.

== Academic career ==
After finishing his Ph.D., Willard returned to Michigan to rejoin the faculty; he became a full professor in 1922 and retired from the university, assuming professor emeritus status, in 1951. He was designated the Henry Russel Lecturer in 1948, noted as the university's highest distinction. He was known for his strong teaching skills and continued teaching at a variety of institutions after his retirement.

During his tenure at Michigan, Willard wrote several widely used and positively reviewed chemistry textbooks and laboratory course manuals, often with former students as coauthors. He also performed consulting work for local industry throughout his career, serving as the Director of the Chemistry and Metallurgy Laboratories for Detroit's Bureau of Aircraft Production in 1917-18 and as a long-term consultant for the Parker Rust-Proof Company.

Willard served as a director of the American Chemical Society from 1934 to 1940 and received the ACS' Fisher Award in Analytical Chemistry in 1951. He was the inaugural recipient of the Anachem Award given by the Association of Analytical Chemists in 1953.

== Research ==
Willard's research interests focused on analytical chemistry and quantitative analysis of inorganic substances. With student G. Frederick Smith, he was particularly productive in studying perchloric acid and periodic acid salts. In addition, he is credited with important work in determining precise atomic weights of chemical elements such as lithium, silver, and antimony, and with development of metal alloy techniques.

== Personal life ==
Willard and his wife Margaret had two daughters, Ann and Nancy. Willard was a photography enthusiast and hobbyist who occasionally sold his work. He died in Ann Arbor, Michigan, on May 7, 1974. Michigan holds a named professorship in his honor; the current Willard Professor of Chemistry is Robert T. Kennedy.
