= Anna Richards Brewster =

American painter

- Born: Mary Ann Richards; 1870; Germantown, Philadelphia, Pennsylvania, US
- Died: August 13, 1952 (aged 82); Scarsdale, New York
- Education: Cowles Art School, Art Students League of New York, Académie Julian
- Known for: Painting
- Spouse: William Tenney Brewster
- Awards: Dodge Prize

Anna Richards Brewster (1870 – August 13, 1952) was an American painter.

== Biography ==
She was born in the Germantown neighborhood of Philadelphia, Pennsylvania. Her parents were the poet and playwright Anna Matlack and the landscape painter William Trost Richards. One of her brothers, Theodore William Richards, won the Nobel Prize in Chemistry in 1914.

She studied at Cowles Art School in Boston, where she won a First Scholarship in Ladies Life Classes in 1888, as well as with William Merritt Chase and John LaFarge at the Art Students League of New York in 1890. In 1890, she won the Dodge Prize awarded by the National Academy for the best picture painted by an American woman of any age. The winning painting, titled An Interlude to Chopin, has since been lost. She traveled to Europe periodically between 1890 and 1895, painting alongside her father in England, Ireland and Scotland, and studying at Académie Julian in Paris. In 1896, she relocated to London where she lived for nine years, keeping a public studio in Chelsea and exhibiting four times at the Royal Academy of Arts.

Brewster illustrated several publications in collaboration with her mother Anna Matlack throughout the 1890s, including A New Alice in the Old Wonderland in 1895, Letter and spirit, dramatic sonnets of inward life, published 1898, and a translation of a German folktale, Sintram and His Companions, published in 1900. The success of these publications led to a commission for illustrations in a 1906 edition of Bill Nye's Comic History of England (1896).

In 1905, she married Barnard College literature professor William Tenney Brewster, who thereafter encouraged her to paint. The couple traveled extensively in Europe, North Africa, Egypt, Palestine, Syria and the United States. Her active professional output slowed after the death of her young son, Herbert, in 1910, yet she continued to paint landscapes abroad, exhibit work and participate in artistic communities. She was a founding member of the Scarsdale Art Association, where she served as the first Vice President of Artist members, and a member of the National Association of Women Painters and Sculptors. Throughout the 1910s she carried out commissions, including a World War I poster distributed nationally by the Red Cross, as well as a series of eight portraits of Columbia University professors. During this period she also had several solo shows at New York art galleries, and continued to exhibit periodically at the National Academy until 1935.

Brewster died at home in Scarsdale, New York, on August 13, 1952, survived by her husband and one sister.

== Legacy ==
Anna Richards Brewster was among the most successful international women artists of her time, yet her name has largely been forgotten. Upon her death in 1952, memorial exhibitions were organized at the Museum of the City of New York, the Butler Institute of American Art and the Georgia Museum of Art. Her husband gave much of her work to public and private institutions at the time, and published a series of four books detailing her life and art. She is known today for sculptures and illustrations as well as paintings, which are found in museums and private collections across the United States and Europe. Like many American artists at the turn of the 20th century, Brewster made paintings of scenes from her travels; the Huntsville Museum of Art has one of fishermen in Volendam. Throughout the 1970s, her work was included in several posthumous exhibitions alongside the paintings of her father William Trost Richards, including at the Pennsylvania Academy of the Fine Arts and the New Britain Museum of American Art. Recent decades have seen a slight revival of interest in her work, including a solo exhibition at the Newport Art Museum in 1985, and a major solo exhibition in 2008 which traveled between the Hudson River Museum, Butler Institute of American Art and the Fresno Metropolitan Museum. The catalogue for the 2008 exhibition, edited by Judith Kafka Maxwell, contained extensive biographical articles, as well as the first scholarly appraisals of her life and works within the context of late Victorian and early twentieth century women artists.

== Books illustrated ==
- A New Alice in the Old Wonderland (1895), as by Anna M. Richards (her mother) and Anna M. Richards, Jr.
- Letter and Spirit: Dramatic Sonnets of Inward Life (1898), as by A. M. Richards and Anna Richards
- Sintram and His Companions (1900), as by de la Motte Fouque, A. M. Richards (mother as translator) and Anna Richards
- Bill Nye's Comic History of England (1906), as illustrated by W. W. Goodes and A. M. Richards

== See also ==
- List of Orientalist artists
- Orientalism

== Sources ==
- William Tenney Brewster (ed) A Book of Sketches by Anna Richards Brewster, 1954–57
- Judith Kafka Maxwell (ed) Anna Richards Brewster, American Impressionist, University of California Press, 2008, ISBN 9780520257498
