= Oxovanadium(IV) perchlorate =

Names
- Other names: Vanadyl diperchlorate; Vanadium(IV) oxo perchlorate

Identifiers
| CAS Number | 15305-73-4; pentahydrate: 15333-33-2 |
| 3D model (JSmol) | Interactive image; pentahydrate: Interactive image |
- InChI: InChI=1S/2ClHO4.O.V/c2*2-1(3,4)5;;/h2*(H,2,3,4,5);;/q;;;+2/p-2 Key: YNCCXWVWYIQFSV-UHFFFAOYSA-L; pentahydrate: InChI=1S/2ClHO4.5H2O.O.V/c2*2-1(3,4)5;;;;;;;/h2*(H,2,3,4,5);5*1H2;;/q;;;;;;;;+2/p-2 Key: CFOSYIGLCPFXMP-UHFFFAOYSA-L
- SMILES: O=[V+2].[O-]Cl(=O)(=O)=O.[O-]Cl(=O)(=O)=O; pentahydrate: O.O.O.O.O.O=Cl(=O)(=O)[O-].[V+2]=O.[O-]Cl(=O)(=O)=O

Properties
| Chemical formula | VO(ClO_{4})_{2} |
| Molar mass | 265.84 g/mol |
| Appearance | Blue crystalline solid or solution (hydrated forms) |
| Solubility in water | Soluble in water |
- Except where otherwise noted, data are given for materials in their standard state (at 25 °C [77 °F], 100 kPa). Infobox references

Oxovanadium(IV) perchlorate is an inorganic compound containing the vanadyl ion, VO^{2+}, and perchlorate anions, with the formula VO(ClO_{4})_{2}. It is usually encountered in hydrated form or in aqueous solution. The pentahydrate, VO(ClO_{4})_{2}·5H_{2}O, is a well-characterized form.

== Preparation ==
Oxovanadium(IV) perchlorate can be prepared from vanadyl sulfate by metathesis with a soluble perchlorate salt. For example, aqueous vanadyl sulfate and barium perchlorate react to precipitate insoluble barium sulfate, leaving oxovanadium(IV) perchlorate in solution:

VOSO_{4} + Ba(ClO_{4})_{2} → VO(ClO_{4})_{2} + BaSO_{4}↓

The resulting solution can be concentrated by evaporation.

An older preparation used vanadium(IV) hydroxide and approximately 3.5 N perchloric acid.

== Properties ==
=== Hydration and aqueous structure ===
The pentahydrate, VO(ClO_{4})_{2}·5H_{2}O, dissolves readily in water. In dilute aqueous solution the vanadium(IV) centre is present predominantly as the pentaaquaoxovanadium(IV) ion, [VO(H_{2}O)_{5}]^{2+}, with perchlorate acting mainly as a non-coordinating counterion.

Modern structural and spectroscopic studies of aqueous VO(ClO_{4})_{2} likewise support a strongly hydrated VO^{2+} cation with weak perchlorate coordination in water.

The characteristic blue colour of its aqueous solutions is due to the d^{1} oxovanadium(IV) ion.

=== Coordination chemistry ===
Oxovanadium(IV) perchlorate is commonly used as a source of VO^{2+} in coordination chemistry because perchlorate is only weakly coordinating.

Addition of dimethyl sulfoxide to concentrated aqueous VO(ClO_{4})_{2} gives the complex [VO(DMSO)_{5}](ClO_{4})_{2}. Similar complexes are known with other oxygen-donor ligands.

A methyl phenyl sulfoxide complex of composition VO(ClO_{4})_{2}·4MPSO has also been reported.

Oxovanadium(IV) perchlorate has therefore been widely used as a precursor to other vanadyl complexes.

== Safety ==
Oxovanadium(IV) perchlorate is an oxidizing perchlorate salt. Contact with combustible or strongly reducing materials should be avoided.
