= Magnesium perchlorate =

- Magnesium perchlorate

Identifiers
| CAS Number | 10034-81-8; 64010-42-0 (hydrate); 13446-19-0 (hexahydrate) |
| 3D model (JSmol) | Interactive image |
| ChemSpider | 23223 |
| ECHA InfoCard | 100.030.086 |
| PubChem CID | 24840 |
| RTECS number | SC8925000 |
| UNII | 7N77Z541YF |
| CompTox Dashboard (EPA) | DTXSID70890617 |
- InChI: InChI=1S/2ClHO4.Mg/c2*2-1(3,4)5;/h2*(H,2,3,4,5);/q;;+2/p-2 Key: MPCRDALPQLDDFX-UHFFFAOYSA-L; InChI=1/2ClHO4.Mg/c2*2-1(3,4)5;/h2*(H,2,3,4,5);/q;;+2/p-2 Key: MPCRDALPQLDDFX-NUQVWONBAH
- SMILES: [Mg+2].O=Cl(=O)(=O)[O-].[O-]Cl(=O)(=O)=O

Properties
| Chemical formula | Mg(ClO_{4})_{2} |
| Molar mass | 223.206 g/mol |
| Appearance | white powder, deliquescent |
| Odor | odorless |
| Density | 2.21 g/cm^{3} (anhydrous); 1.98 g/cm^{3} (hexahydrate) |
| Melting point | 251 °C (484 °F; 524 K) (anhydrous); 95-100 °C (hexahydrate) |
| Boiling point | decomposition |
| Solubility in water | 99.3 g/100 mL |
| Solubility in ethanol | 23.96 g/100 mL |

Hazards
- Occupational safety and health (OHS/OSH)
| Main hazards | Oxidizer |
- GHS labelling
| Pictograms | (GHS03: Oxidizing) (GHS07: Exclamation mark) |
| Signal word | Danger |
| Hazard statements | H272, H315, H319, H335 |
| Precautionary statements | P220, P261, P305+P351+P338 |
| NFPA 704 (fire diamond) | 1 0 0 OX |
| Safety data sheet (SDS) | External MSDS |

Related compounds
| Other cations | Calcium perchlorate Barium perchlorate |
- Except where otherwise noted, data are given for materials in their standard state (at 25 °C [77 °F], 100 kPa). verify (what is ?) Infobox references

Magnesium perchlorate is a powerful oxidizing agent, with the formula Mg(ClO_{4})_{2}. The salt is also a superior drying agent for gas analysis.

Magnesium perchlorate decomposes at 250 °C. The heat of formation is -568.90 kJ/mol.

Magnesium perchlorate is very soluble in water (99.3 g/100 mL at room temperature), and because of this the freezing point depression can be quite high, with the eutectic point at −64 °C (−83 °F).

It is sold under the trade name Anhydrone. Manufacture of this product on a semi-industrial scale was first performed by G. Frederick Smith in his garage in Urbana Illinois, and later at a permanent facility in Columbus, Ohio called G. Frederick Smith Chemical Co. He sold the magnesium perchlorate to A. H. Thomas Co., now Thomas Scientific, under the trade name Dehydrite.

== Uses ==
It is used as desiccant to dry gas or air samples, but is no longer advised for use as a general desiccant due to hazards inherent in perchlorates. It is dried by heating at 220 °C under vacuum.

Magnesium perchlorate and other perchlorates have been found on Mars. Being a drying agent, magnesium perchlorate retains water from the atmosphere and may release it when conditions are favorable and temperature is above 273 K. Briny solutions that contain salts such as magnesium perchlorate have a lower melting point than that of pure water. Therefore the abundance of magnesium and other perchlorate salts on Mars could support the theory that liquid aqueous solutions might exist on or below the surface, where temperature and pressure conditions would ordinarily cause the water to freeze.

== Production ==
Magnesium perchlorate is produced by the reaction of magnesium hydroxide and perchloric acid.
