= Heather Willauer =

American analytical chemist and patents holder

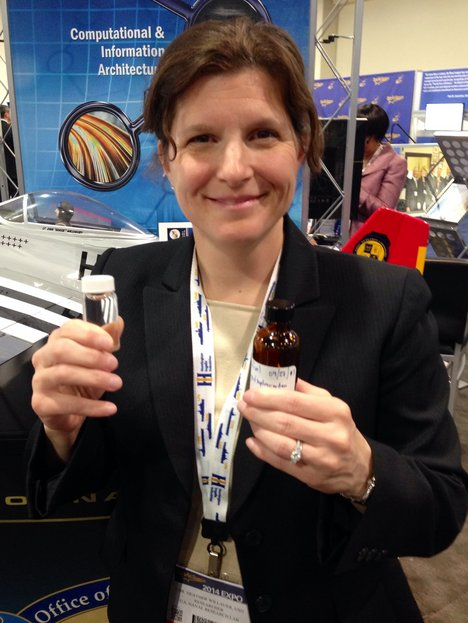
- Willauer shows samples of synthetic fuel
- Born: 1974 (age 51–52)
- Citizenship: United States
- Education: Berry College; University of Alabama
- Known for: Synthetic fuel from seawater
- Scientific career
- Fields: Analytical chemistry
- Workplaces: United States Naval Research Laboratory

Heather D. Willauer (born 1974) is an American analytical chemist and inventor working in Washington, D.C., at the United States Naval Research Laboratory (NRL). Leading a research team, Willauer has patented a method for removing dissolved carbon dioxide (CO_{2}) from seawater, in parallel with hydrogen (H_{2}) recovered by conventional water electrolysis. Willauer is also searching to improve the catalysts required to enable a continuous Fischer–Tropsch process to recombine carbon monoxide (CO) and hydrogen gases into complex hydrocarbon liquids to synthesize jet fuel for Navy aircraft.

Especially significant for the Navy is the possibility of maintaining naval air operations in remote areas without depending too much on long-distance transport of jet fuel across oceans. The Navy is also studying the feasibility of constructing on-shore facilities capable of synthesizing kerosene from hydrogen and CO_{2}, both extracted from seawater constituents. Because of the very high electrical power required by water electrolysis to produce considerable amounts of hydrogen, nuclear power plants or ocean thermal energy conversion (OTEC) are necessary to fuel the industrial installations built on-shore on remote islands close to the sea in strategic locations.

== Education ==
Willauer attended Berry College in Georgia, graduating with a bachelor's degree in chemistry in 1996. In mid-1999 she participated in the 11th International Conference on Partitioning in Aqueous Two-Phase Systems, held in Gulf Shores, Alabama. In 2002, she earned a doctorate in analytical chemistry from the University of Alabama, writing her thesis on "Fundamentals of phase behavior and solute partitioning in ABS and applications to the paper industry," the "ABS" an abbreviation for "aqueous biphasic systems". She began working with the NRL as an associate, then in 2004 she advanced to the position of research chemist.

== Career ==
Willauer started researching biphasic systems and phase transitions after graduating from Berry College. In 1998 she studied aqueous biphasic systems (ABS) for the potential of recapturing valuable dyes from textile manufacturing effluent. She investigated ions and catalysts.

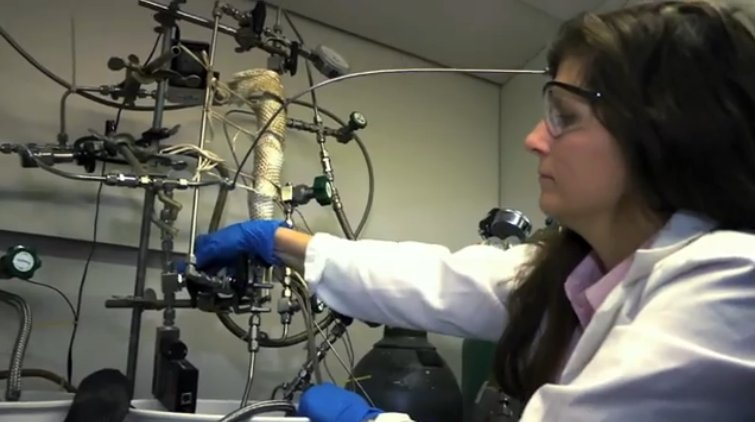
Willauer at the NRL

In the 2000s, Willauer began studying methods for extracting CO_{2} and H_{2} from seawater, for the purpose of reacting these molecules into hydrocarbons by using the Fischer–Tropsch process. She also investigated modified iron (Fe) catalysts and studied zeolite (nanoporous aluminosilicate) catalyst supports for recombining these molecules into jet fuel.

Previous studies had concluded that CO_{2}, under the form of the bicarbonate anion (HCO_{3}^{–}) dominant (96% mole fraction) in the seawater inorganic carbon species could not be economically removed from seawater. However, by acidifying seawater by means of an adapted electrolysis cell with cation permeable membranes (dubbed a three-chambered electrochemical acidification cell), it is possible to economically convert HCO_{3}^{–} into CO_{2} at a pH lower than 6 and to increase the extraction yield. In January 2011, the NRL installed a prototype of seawater electrolysis cell at Naval Air Station Key West in Florida.

In 2017, Willauer et al. were granted a patent for a CO_{2} extraction device from seawater, in the form of an electrolytic-cation exchange module (E-CEM). The E-CEM is seen as a "key step" in the production of synthetic fuel from seawater. Other researchers named in the patent are Felice DiMascio, Dennis R. Hardy, Jeffrey Baldwin, Matthew Bradley, James Morris, Ramagopal Ananth and Frederick W. Williams.

== Feasibility of jet fuel synthesis ==
Willauer et al. (2012) estimated that jet fuel could be synthesized from seawater in quantities up to 100,000 US gal (380,000 L) per day, at a cost of three to six U.S. dollars per gallon. Willauer et al. (2014) showed that the Fischer-Tropsch catalyst could be modified to synthesize various fuels such as methanol and natural gas, as well as the olefins that can be used as the building blocks for jet fuel.

Willauer et al. calculated that about 23,000 US gal (87,000 L) of seawater must be driven through the process to obtain the quantities of hydrogen and CO_{2} necessary to synthesize one gallon of jet fuel.

Seawater was chosen because it contains 140 times more CO_{2} by volume than the atmosphere, and conventional water electrolysis also yields H_{2}. The equipment for processing seawater is much smaller than that for processing air. Willauer considered that seawater was the "best option" for a source of synthetic jet fuel. By April 2014, the Willauer's team had not yet made fuel to the quality standard required for military jets, but they were able in September 2013 to use the fuel to fly a radio-controlled model airplane powered by a common two-stroke internal combustion engine.

Because the process requires a considerable input of electrical energy (~ 250 MW electricity mainly for the H_{2} production by water electrolysis and also to a lesser extent for the CO_{2} recovery from seawater), it cannot be performed on a large ship, even on a nuclear aircraft-carrier. The installations processing seawater to obtain H_{2} and CO_{2} (in fact CO), the two essential ingredients necessary for the Fischer–Tropsch process, must be constructed on-shore, close to the sea, on islands in strategic remote locations (e.g., Hawai, Guam, Diego-Garcia) and powered by a nuclear reactor, or by ocean thermal energy conversion (OTEC).

== Publications ==
=== Papers ===
- Jonathan G. Huddleston; Heather D. Willauer; Kathy R. Boaz; Robin D. Rogers (26 June 1998). "Separation and recovery of food coloring dyes using aqueous biphasic extraction chromatographic resins". Journal of Chromatography B. 711 (1–2): 237–244. doi:10.1016/S0378-4347(97)00662-2. PMID 9699992.
- Robin D. Rogers; Heather D. Willauer; Scott T. Griffin; Jonathan G. Huddleston (26 June 1998). "Partitioning of small organic molecules in aqueous biphasic systems". Journal of Chromatography B. 711 (1–2): 255–263. doi:10.1016/S0378-4347(97)00661-0. PMID 9699994.
- Heather D. Willauer; Jonathan G. Huddleston; Scott T. Griffin; Robin D. Rogers (1999). "Partitioning of Aromatic Molecules in Aqueous Biphasic Solutions". Separation Science and Technology. 34 (6–7): 1069–1090. doi:10.1080/01496399908951081.
- Jonathan G. Huddleston; Heather D. Willauer; Robin D. Rogers (23 June 2000). "Solvatochromic studies in polyethylene glycol–salt aqueous biphasic systems". Journal of Chromatography B. 743 (1–2): 137–149. doi:10.1016/S0378-4347(00)00230-9. PMID 10942281.
- Mian Li; Heather D. Willauer; Jonathan G. Huddleston; Robin D. Rogers (2001). "Temperature Effects on Polymer-based Aqueous Biphasic Extraction Technology in the Paper Pulping Process". Separation Science and Technology. 36 (5–6): 835–847. doi:10.1081/SS-100103623. S2CID 96760221.
- Heather D. Willauer; Jonathan G. Huddleston; Robin D. Rogers (May 2002). "Solvent Properties of Aqueous Biphasic Systems Composed of Polyethylene Glycol and Salt Characterized by the Free Energy of Transfer of a Methylene Group between the Phases and by a Linear Solvation Energy Relationship". Industrial & Engineering Chemistry Research. 41 (11): 2591–2601. doi:10.1021/ie0107800.
- Ann E. Visser; W. Matthew Reichert; Richard P. Swatloski; Heather D. Willauer; Jonathan G. Huddleston; Robin D. Rogers (July 2002). "23: Characterization of Hydrophilic and Hydrophobic Ionic Liquids: Alternatives to Volatile Organic Compounds for Liquid–Liquid Separations". In Robin D. Rogers; Kenneth R. Seddon (eds.). Ionic Liquids. ACS Symposium Series. Vol. 818. pp. 289–303. doi:10.1021/bk-2002-0818.ch023. ISBN 978-0-8412-3789-6.
- Heather D. Willauer; John Hoover; Frederick W. Williams; George W. Mushrush (January 2004). "The Construction of an Improved Automated Atomizer for Evaluating Jet Fuel Flammability". Petroleum Science & Technology.
- George W. Mushrush; James H. Wynne; Heather D. Willauer; Christopher T. Lloyd; Janet M. Hughes; Erna J. Beal (2004). "Recycled Soybean Cooking Oils As Blending Stocks for Diesel Fuels". Industrial & Engineering Chemistry Research. 43 (16).
- Heather D. Willauer; Ramagopal Ananth; John B. Hoover; George W. Mushrush; Frederick W. Williams (November 2004). "A Critical Evaluation of An Automated Rotary Atomizer". Petroleum Science & Technology.
- George W. Mushrush; Heather D. Willauer; John Hoover; Jean Bailey; Frederick W. Williams (January 2005). "Flammability and Petroleum Based Hydraulic Fluids". Petroleum Science & Technology.
- "Instability Reactions and Recycled Soybean Derived Biodiesel Fuel Liquids. George W. Mushrush, James H. Wynne, Christopher T. Lloyd, Heather Willauer, Janet M. Hughes". Energy Sources. January 2005.
- Heather D. Willauer; John B. Hoover; George W. Mushrush; Frederick W. Williams (March 21, 2005). "Evaluation of Jet Fuel Aerosols Using a Rotary Atomizer". 4th Joint Meeting of the U.S. Sections of the Combustion Institute. Archived from the original on March 4, 2016.
- H.D. Willauer; D.R. Hardy; F. DiMascio; R.W. Dorner; F.W. Williams (2010). "Synfuel from Seawater" (PDF). NRL Review. United States Naval Research Laboratory: 153–154. Archived from the original (PDF) on 2013-03-06.
- Ramagopal Ananth; Heather D. Willauer; John P. Farley; Frederick W. Williams (2012). "Effects of Fine Water Mist on a Confined Blast". Fire Technology. 48 (3): 641–675. doi:10.1007/s10694-010-0156-y. S2CID 109720753.
- Heather D. Willauer; Dennis R. Hardy; Kenneth R. Schultz; Frederick W. Williams (2012). "The feasibility and current estimated capital costs of producing jet fuel at sea using carbon dioxide and hydrogen". Journal of Renewable and Sustainable Energy. 4 (3): 033111. doi:10.1063/1.4719723. S2CID 109523882.

=== Patents ===
- Extraction of Carbon Dioxide and Hydrogen From Seawater and Hydrocarbon Production Therefrom Filed: December 2, 2010. Granted: November 17, 2011.
- Recovery of CO from seawater/aqueous bicarbonate systems using a multi-layer gas permeable membrane Filed: June 25, 2009. Granted: November 20, 2012.
- Catalytic support for use in carbon dioxide hydrogenation reactions Filed: October 28, 2010. Granted: February 25, 2014.
- Method for the continuous recovery of carbon dioxide from acidified seawater Filed August 10, 2012. Granted March 4, 2014.
