= GFS Chemicals =

Chemical company

GFS Chemicals Inc
- Formerly: G. Frederick Smith Chemical Company
- Type: Privately Held
- Industry: Fine and Specialty Chemical Manufacturing
- Founded: 1924 in Urbana, Illinois, USA
- Founder: G. Frederick Smith
- Headquarters: Columbus, Ohio, USA
- Key people: J. Steel Hutchinson
- Website: www.gfschemicals.com

GFS Chemicals Inc, formerly known as G. Frederick Smith Chemical Company, is a privately owned fine and specialty chemical company with headquarters in Powell, Ohio and manufacturing facilities in Columbus, Ohio. It was founded by G. Frederick Smith in Urbana, Illinois in 1924, and moved to Columbus, Ohio in 1928.

GFS Chemicals currently serves over seventy countries and a variety of industries, including: Alternative energy, energy storage, pharmaceuticals, biotechnology, electronics, etching, and environmental and research analytics. The company has approximately 100 employees. Its various divisions are managed by three separate units: Organic Specialty Materials, Inorganic Specialty Materials, and Analytical Reagents & Research Chemicals Catalog Division.

== History ==
=== 1920s ===
The Smith Chemical Company was started in G. Frederick Smith's garage in Urbana, Illinois as a result of his use of magnesium perchlorate as a super drying agent. Smith enlisted the help of his brothers Allyne (who studied engineering at Ohio State) and Clarence (who worked for a local newspaper).

In 1928, G. Frederick Smith Chemical Company moved to Columbus, Ohio on McKinley Avenue, and began to sell magnesium perchlorate under the trade name "Dehydrite" for A.H. Thomas Co., later Thomas Scientific. G. Frederick Smith Chemical Company would become one of the leading perchloric acid and perchlorate salt producers in the world.

=== 1930s and 1940s ===
University of Illinois graduate student Charles Getz, in an attempt to store milk anaerobically to prevent spoilage, accidentally invents the world's first aerosol dispensed product, instant whipped cream. He and G.F. Smith found nitrous oxide to be the most suitable gas and started the Aerated Products Company, later known as Instantwhip. The company was later turned over to G.F. Smith's son Clifton, although Getz would retain the patent.

Smith started producing commercial quantities of 1,10-phenanthroline and its derivatives, producing a range of indicators for use in analytical chemistry. He investigated the preparation of cerium compounds for use as titrants in oxidation and reduction reactions. Aided by phenanthroline indicators, he produced hexanitratocerate as a primary standard. Studies of periodic acid, iodic acid, and their salts prompted a new line of products.

In the 1940s, Rare earth products, such as ceric ammonium nitrate, and heteroaromatic ligands, are introduced to the product line.

=== 1960s, 70s, and 80s ===
In the 1960s, the company developed and produced new high purity redistilled inorganic acids in response.

In the 1960s, Allyne Smith retired and turned control of G. Frederick Smith Chemical Company over to Darrell Hutchinson, his son-in-law, to run as President and CEO.

In the 70s, the company . collaborated with Motorola on the first ceric ammonium nitrate-based chrome etchants for use in early computer chips. The firm became the sole US manufacturer of perchloric acid after Hooker Occidental Petroleum) decides to abandon that field.

G. Frederick Smith died in 1976.

In the 80s, Instantwhip and G. Frederick Chemical Co. parted ways following a stock swap agreement between those with ownership stakes in both of the firms.

=== 1990s ===
In the 1990s, G. Frederick Smith Chemical Co. shortened its name to GFS Chemicals, Inc. and acquired Ericsen Instruments' Karl Fischer reagent business (now the Watermark brand), and several other specialty organic product lines from Farchan Laboratories and Shawnee Chemical Company.

In the 90s, GFS became ISO 9001:2008 Certified. A new plant was built specifically for the production of perchloric acid. In ___, J. Steel Hutchinson became President of GFS Chemicals.

=== 2000s ===
A new organic production facility was built, allowing for the expansion of previously purchased product lines, including liquid ammonia chemistry, silanes, acetylenes, and other organics.

The company acquired APS Analytical Standards, a maker of turbidimeters, colorimeters, and spectrometers. This business was moved from California to Columbus.

Distilled acids demand increased, and GFS expanded its distillation equipment. Inorganic and organic research labs were built for continued research and quality control testing.

The company attained Society of Chemical Manufacturers and Affiliates (SOCMA) Chem Steward Tier I Certification.

GFS partnered with Ensign-Bickford Aerospace and Defense for the manufacture of Ammonia Borane.

=== 2010s ===
A Catalog Order Distribution Center was purchased on Kaderly Drive on the west side of Columbus; it now houses all GFS catalog fulfillment activities, private labeling and analytical laboratory reagents manufacturing.

Due to import issues with China, GFS embarked on a research campaign and becomes the only domestically secured chain of supply for cerium.

A new grade of ceric ammonium nitrate was introduced with tighter metals tolerances for use as an electronics-grade etchant component.

The American Association for Laboratory Accreditation (A2LA) expanded accreditation to GFS for ISO/IEC 17025:2005 for turbidity, pH buffers, and conductivity standards.

== Divisions of the Company ==
=== Inorganic Specialty Materials Division ===
Located in Columbus, OH, the Inorganic manufacturing facility is the original cornerstone of GFS Chemicals, as first used by G. Frederick Smith.

=== Organic Specialty Materials Division ===
Located on River Street Columbus, OH, the Organic manufacturing facility as a location is a relatively new facility. GFS has always performed organic chemistries, however after the acquisition period more space was needed to further develop the business and to explore the future scientific opportunities which could be advanced. These newer developments have at times crossed over with the Inorganic side with anhydrous Lithium Perchlorate in the form of Lithium Perchlorate-Diethyl Ether to promote synthetic organic chemical synthesis in bulk, as an example. They added a Kilo lab and a Distillation lab as well in the proceeding years.

=== Analytical Reagents and Research Chemicals Catalog Division ===
Located on Kaderly Drive, Columbus, OH, the newest addition to the GFS landscape is also the oldest business. G. Frederick Smith was spurred to create many of the chemical compounds, especially perchlorates and trace metal perchloric acid, in response to the needs of his colleagues in analytical chemistry. This tradition is continued here and is the most commonly associated part of the business when a chemist or researcher hears of GFS Chemicals. The trace metal acids are especially popular among researchers who are looking to digest organics for study without the risk of metal contamination. Recently the American Association of Laboratory Accreditation expanded the accreditation to meet ISO/IEC 17025:2005 for the standards and buffers produced here as well as EPA approval for the AMCO Clear® line of turbidity standards.
