= Robert Kennedy (chemist) =

American chemist and professor

- Born: Robert Travis Kennedy; November 11, 1962 (age 64); Sault Ste. Marie, Michigan, U.S.
- Education: University of Florida; University of North Carolina
- Awards: Martin Medal (2019); ACS Award in Chromatography (2017)
- Scientific career
- Fields: Chemistry, analytical chemistry, and neuroscience
- Workplaces: University of Michigan
- Doctoral advisor: James Jorgenson

Robert Travis Kennedy is an American chemist specializing in bioanalytical chemistry including liquid chromatography, capillary electrophoresis, and microfluidics. He is currently the Hobart H. Willard Distinguished University Professor of Chemistry and the chair of the department of chemistry at the University of Michigan. He holds joint appointments with the Department of Pharmacology and Department Macromolecular Science and Engineering. Kennedy is an associate editor of Analytical Chemistry and ACS Measurement Science AU.

== Early life and education ==
Kennedy was born on November 11, 1962, in Sault Ste. Marie, Michigan. He earned a Bachelor of Science degree in chemistry at the University of Florida in 1984 and a Ph.D. from the University of North Carolina-Chapel Hill (UNC) in 1988 while working under James Jorgenson. He was an NSF post-doctoral fellow at UNC from 1989 to 1991 with R. Mark Wightman.

== Academic career and research interests ==
Kennedy became a professor of chemistry at the University of Florida in 1991. After 11 years, he moved to the University of Michigan. He has graduated approximately 80 graduate students. Kennedy's research focuses on developing analytical instrumentation and methods that can help solve biological problems. He is considered a leader in the field of analytical chemistry, and an expert in endocrinology, neurochemistry, and high-throughput analysis. Major contributions to analytical chemistry include affinity probe capillary electrophoresis, in vivo neurochemical measurements, and ultra-high pressure liquid chromatography. He has been a Lilly Analytical Research Fellow, Alfred P. Sloan Fellow, NSF Presidential Faculty Fellow, and AAAS Fellow.

== Honors and awards ==
- EAS Award for Outstanding Achievements in the Fields of Analytical Chemistry (2023)
- Martin Medal (2019)
- Ralph N. Adams Award in Bioanalyical Chemistry (2016)
- ACS Award in Chromatography (2017)
- CASSS Award for Outstanding Achievements in Separation Science (2017)
- Marcel Golay Award for Lifetime Achievement in Capillary Chromatography (2012)
- Eastern Analytical Symposium Award for Separation Science (2012)
- McKnight Award for Technical Innovations in Neuroscience (2010)
- Rackham Distinguished Faculty Achievement Award (2009)
- American Microchemical Society's Benedetti-Pichler Memorial Award (2001)
