= A New Alice in the Old Wonderland =

1895 novel by Anna M. Richards

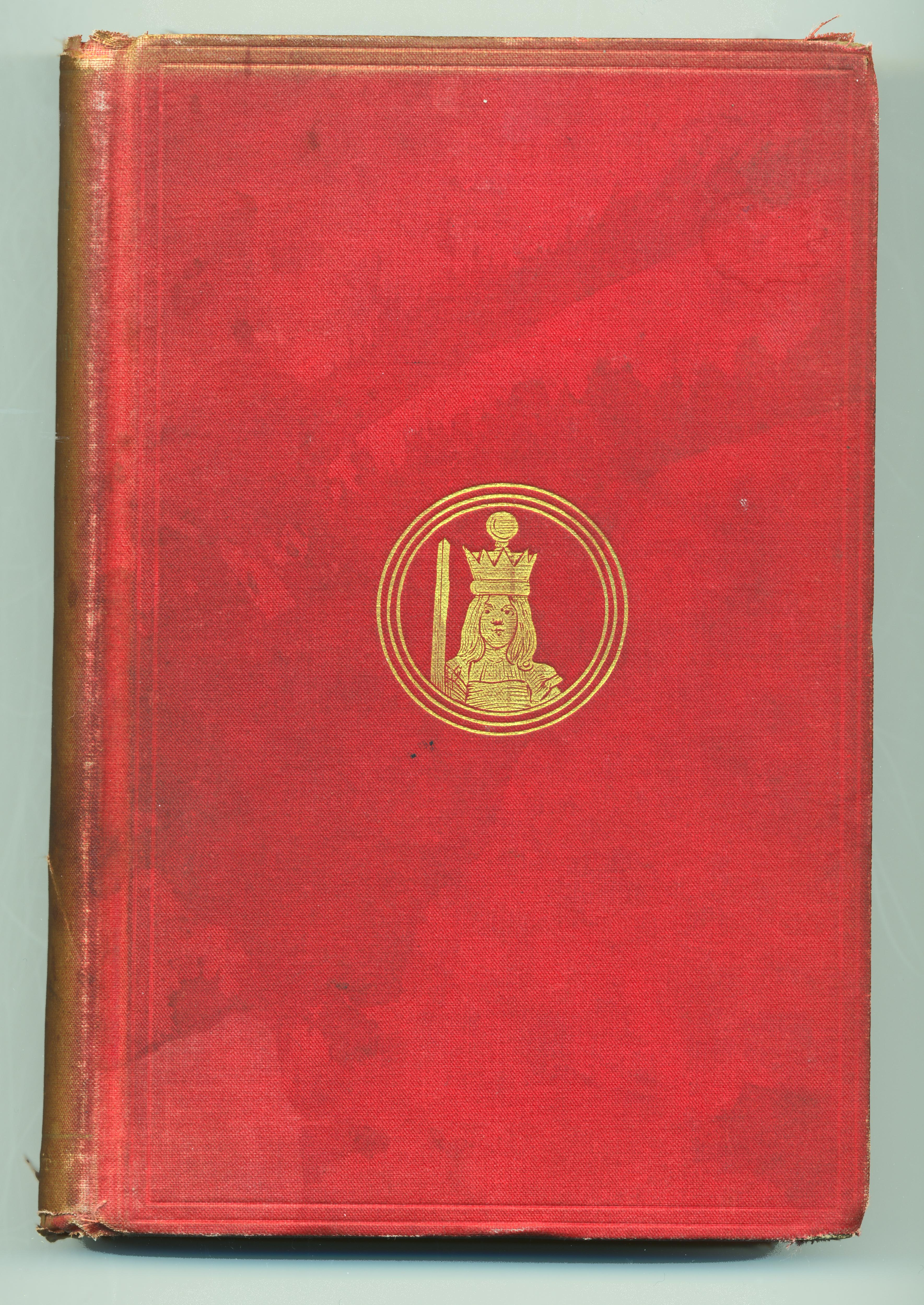
- Cover of the first edition
- Author: Anna M. Richards
- Illustrator: Anna M. Richards, Jr.
- Genre: Fantasy novel
- Publisher: J. B. Lippincott
- Publication date: October 1895
- Publication place: United States
- Media type: Print (hardcover)
- Pages: 309
- OCLC: 531268
- LC Class: PZ8.R363 Ne

A New Alice in the Old Wonderland is a fantasy novel written by Anna M. Richards, illustrated by Anna M. Richards Jr., and published in 1895 by J. B. Lippincott of Philadelphia. According to Carolyn Sigler, it is one of the more important "Alice imitations", or novels inspired by Lewis Carroll's Alice books.

A New Alice features Alice Lee, an American girl with a coincidental name, visiting Wonderland and meeting all the characters she knows from Alice's Adventures in Wonderland (1865) and Through the Looking-Glass (1871). It is illustrated with 67 drawings by the writer's daughter, closely "after" the originals by John Tenniel.

The Preface, pp. 5–6 in the first edition, is illustrated by a drawing of three children and signed "A. M. R., Sr." A rhyming poem in four stanzas, it indicates that the story originated years ago when "unreasonable children three" would accept nothing but the Wonderland of Alice. Evidently Anna M. Richards was the mother, who gave them more of what they knew and loved. Now grown up, one of them made the pictures. With apology to Tenniel and Carroll ("We're not original, nor wise, nor witty"), they plead for mercy from the Critic.

Cover of a recent edition (Evertype Publishing, 2009)

The 2009 Evertype edition credits mother and daughter under their full names Alice Matlack Richards (1835–1900) and Anna Richards Brewster. Brewster, whose given middle name was Mary, not Matlack, became a renowned artist under her married name.

According to Carolyn Sigler, Anna Matlack was already known as a poet and playwright before she married William Trost Richards in 1856, age 20 or 21. They had eight children. In the 1890s she wrote comic poems that were published in American children's magazines. A New Alice was "an expanded version of the stories she had invented for her young children, to whom the novel is dedicated, about their favorite storybook world." A second edition was published in 1896. Sigler interpolates, "Alice Lee—Richards's protagonist as well as her daughter, who is fictionalized in the text". (Sigler, 1996, pp. 56–57).

== Bibliography ==
Publication history

- Richards, Anna M. (1895) A New Alice in the Old Wonderland. Lippincott.
- Richards, Anna M. (2000) A New Alice in the Old Wonderland. Wildside Press. ISBN 1-58715-199-5
- Richards, Anna Matlack (2009) A New Alice in the Old Wonderland. Cathair na Mart, County Mayo, Ireland: Evertype Publishing (www.evertype.com). Edited by Michael Everson. Foreword by Everson. ISBN 978-1-904808-35-0

There are multiple new editions since 2009.

About A New Alice

- Sigler, Carolyn (1996). "Brave New Alice: Anna Matlack Richards's Maternal Wonderland". Children's Literature. 24 (1): 55–73. doi:10.1353/chl.0.0372. S2CID 143616817. Project MUSE 246338.
