= Anna Matlack Richards =

American writer (1834–1900)

- Born: Anna Matlack; 1834
- Died: 1900 (aged 65–66)
- Spouse: William Trost Richards
- Children: 8, among them Theodore William Richards and Anna Richards Brewster

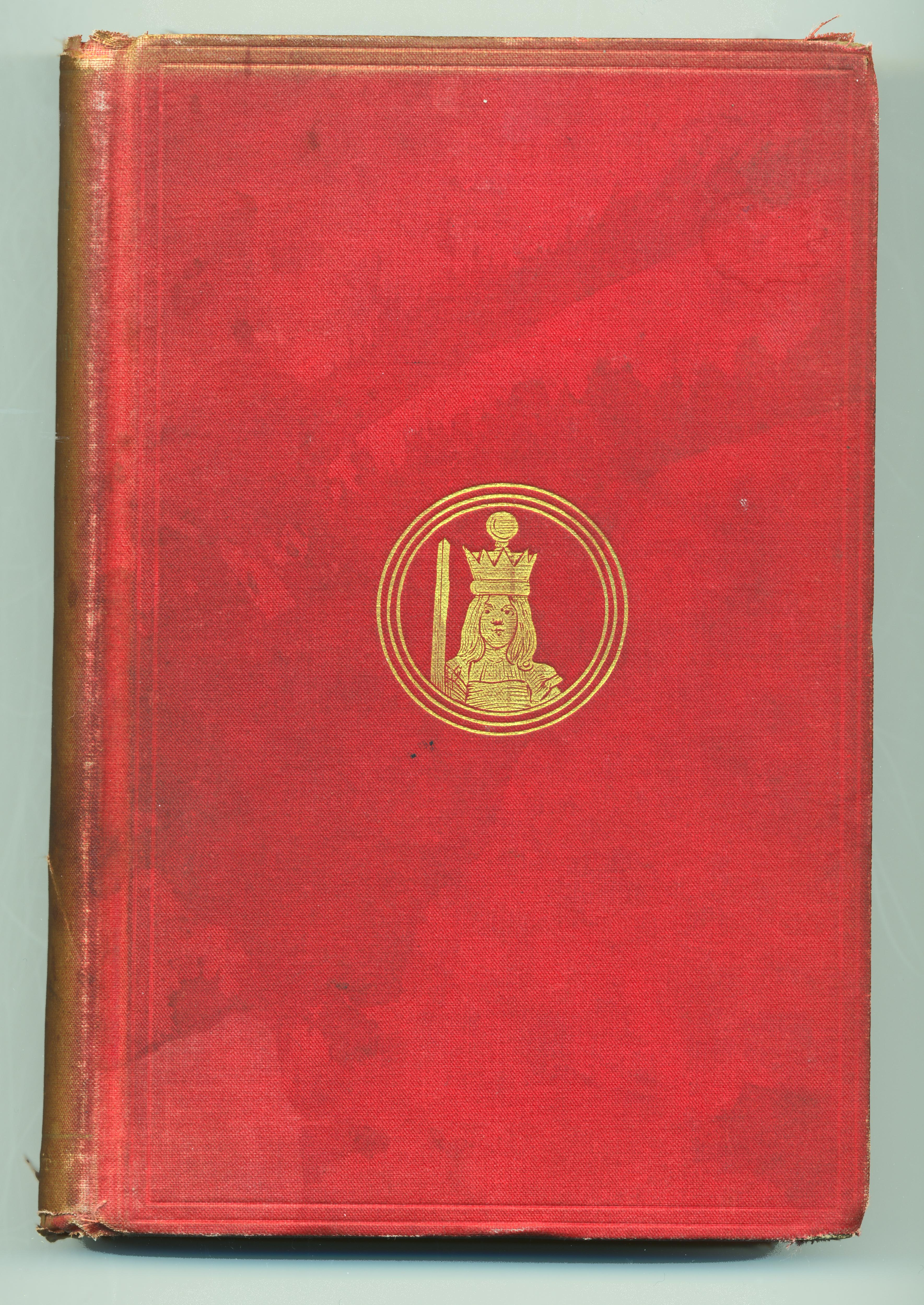
Anna Matlack Richards, A New Alice in the Old Wonderland, (Lippincott,1895).

Anna Matlack Richards (1834–1900) was a 19th-century American children's author, poet and translator best known for her fantasy novel, A New Alice in the Old Wonderland.

== Biography ==
Anna Matlack was raised in a prominent intellectual Quaker family in Philadelphia, Pennsylvania. As a young woman she published fictional works, plays, and poems, including a fictional autobiography as by "Mrs. A. M. Richards" entitled Memories of a Grandmother in 1854. In 1856 she married landscape and maritime painter William Trost Richards. They traveled abroad frequently and lived in Cornwall, England, from 1878 to 1880. The couple had eight children, only five of whom lived past infancy. Matlack educated the children at home to a pre-college level in the arts and sciences.

One of the couple's sons, Theodore William Richards, would later win the 1914 Nobel Prize in Chemistry. Anna Richards Brewster, their sixth child, went on to become an important painter in her own right, having received an early arts education from her father as well.

In 1881 Matlack published Dramatic Sonnets, a collection of verses designed "to give expression to every possible form of conflicting thought and feeling". In the 1890s, she published comic poems for children in the popular children's magazines Harper's Young People and The St. Nicholas Magazine. The success of these comics led her to publish A New Alice in the Old Wonderland in 1895, which featured illustrations by her daughter Anna Richards Brewster. Mother and daughter collaborated on several publications, including Letter and spirit, dramatic sonnets of inward life, published 1898, and a translation of a German folktale, Sintram and His Companions, published in 1900.

== Selected works ==
- Memories of a Grandmother by Mrs. A. M. Richards (Boston: Gould and Lincoln, 1854)
- Dramatic Sonnets (1881)
- Letter and Spirit (1891), LCCN 29-15805
- A New Alice in the Old Wonderland (1895), illus. by her daughter as Anna M. Richards Jr.
- Letter and Spirit: Dramatic Sonnets of Inward Life (1898), illus. by her daughter as Anna Richards
- Sintram and His Companions (1900), by de la Motte Fouque, as translated by A. M. Richards, illus. by Anna Richards

== Sources ==
- Sigler, Carolyn (1996). "Brave New Alice: Anna Matlack Richards's Maternal Wonderland". Children's Literature. 24 (1): 55–73. doi:10.1353/chl.0.0372. S2CID 143616817. Project MUSE 246338.
- Sigler, Carolyn, ed. (October 1997). Alternative Alices: Visions and Revisions of Lewis Carroll's "Alice" Books: An Anthology. Lexington, KY: University Press of Kentucky. ISBN 0-8131-2028-4.
- Judith Kafka Maxwell (ed) Anna Richards Brewster, American Impressionist, University of California Press, 2008, ISBN 9780520257498
