= William Trost Richards =

American landscape painter (1833–1905)

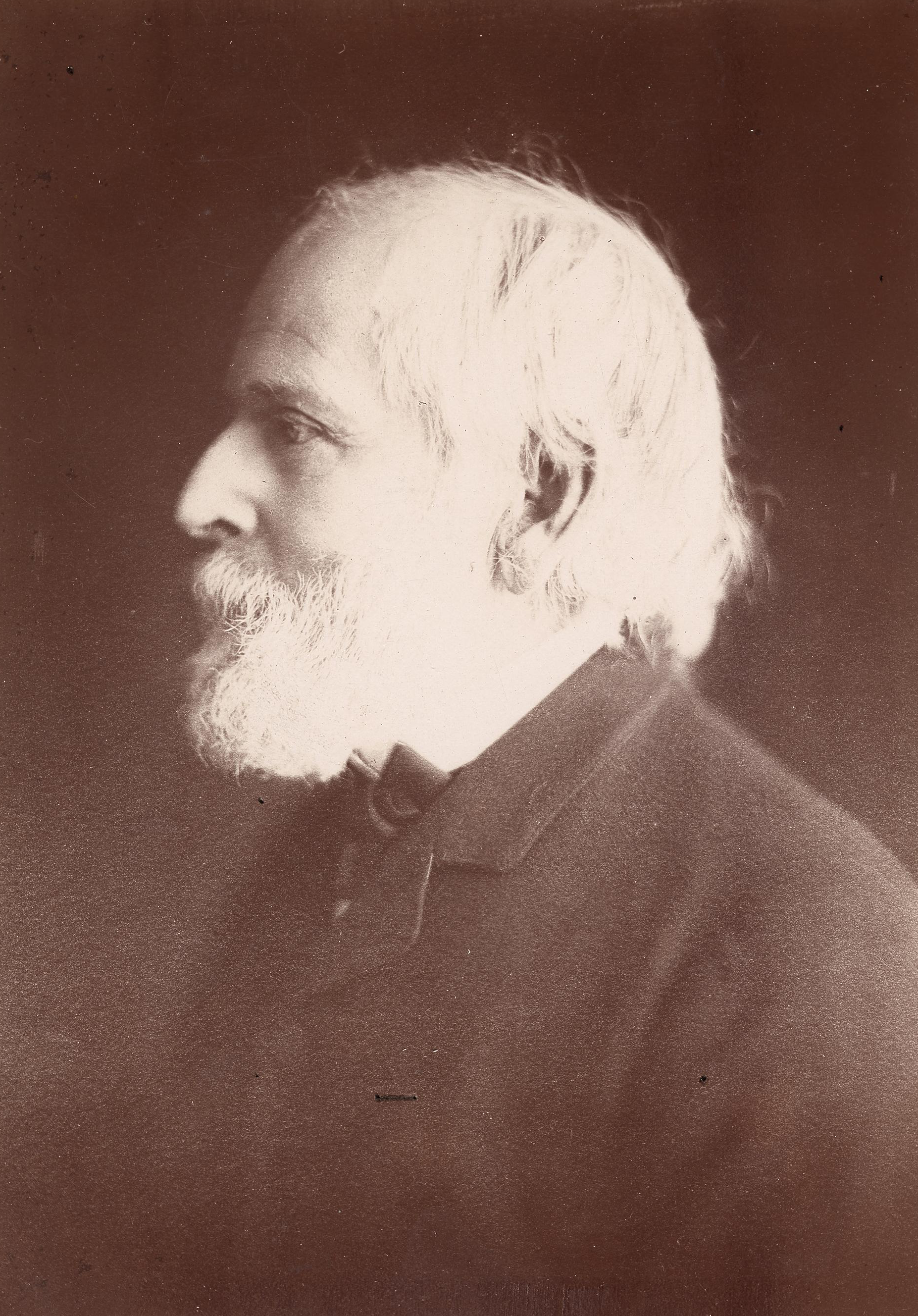
- Born: November 14, 1833; Philadelphia, Pennsylvania. U.S.
- Died: November 8, 1905 (aged 72); Newport, Rhode Island. U.S.
- Known for: Painting
- Movement: Hudson River School; American Pre-Raphaelite Brotherhood
- Spouse: Anna Matlack
- Children: Theodore William Richards

William Trost Richards (November 14, 1833 – November 8, 1905) was an American landscape artist. He was associated with both the Hudson River School and the American Pre-Raphaelite movement.

== Early life and education ==
Richards was born on November 14, 1833, in Philadelphia, Pennsylvania. In 1846 and 1847, he attended the local Central High School. Between 1850 and 1855, he studied part-time with the German artist Paul Weber, while working as designer and illustrator of ornamental metalwork.

== Career ==
Richards's first public exhibit was part of an exhibition in New Bedford, Massachusetts, organized by artist Albert Bierstadt in 1858.

In 1862, he was elected honorary member of the National Academy of Design and was elected as an Academician in 1871. In 1863, he became a member of the Association for the Advancement of Truth in Art. In 1866, he departed for Europe for one year. Upon his return and for the following six years, he spent the summers on the East Coast.

In the 1870s, he produced many acclaimed watercolor views of the White Mountains, several of which are now in the collection of the Metropolitan Museum of Art. Richards exhibited at the National Academy of Design from 1861 to 1899, and at the Brooklyn Art Association from 1863 to 1885. He was elected a full member of the National Academy in 1871.

In 1881, he built a house in Jamestown, Rhode Island, where he lived and worked for the remainder of his life. During this period, he also spent some time working in Matunuck, Rhode Island. He died on April 17, 1905, in Newport, Rhode Island.

=== Style ===
Richards rejected the romanticized and stylized approach of other Hudson River painters and instead insisted on meticulous factual renderings. His views of the White Mountains are almost photographic in their realism. In later years, Richards painted almost exclusively marine watercolors.

His works are featured today in many important American museums, including the National Gallery, the Saint Louis Art Museum, the Smithsonian American Art Museum, the Wadsworth Atheneum, the Philadelphia Museum of Art, the Pennsylvania Academy of the Fine Arts, the Yale University Art Gallery, the High Museum of Art, the Museum of Fine Arts, Boston, the Fogg Art Museum, the Brooklyn Museum of Art, the Berkshire Museum, the Thyssen-Bornemisza Museum and Crystal Bridges Museum of American Art.

His daughter Anna Richards Brewster also became a painter.

== Gallery ==
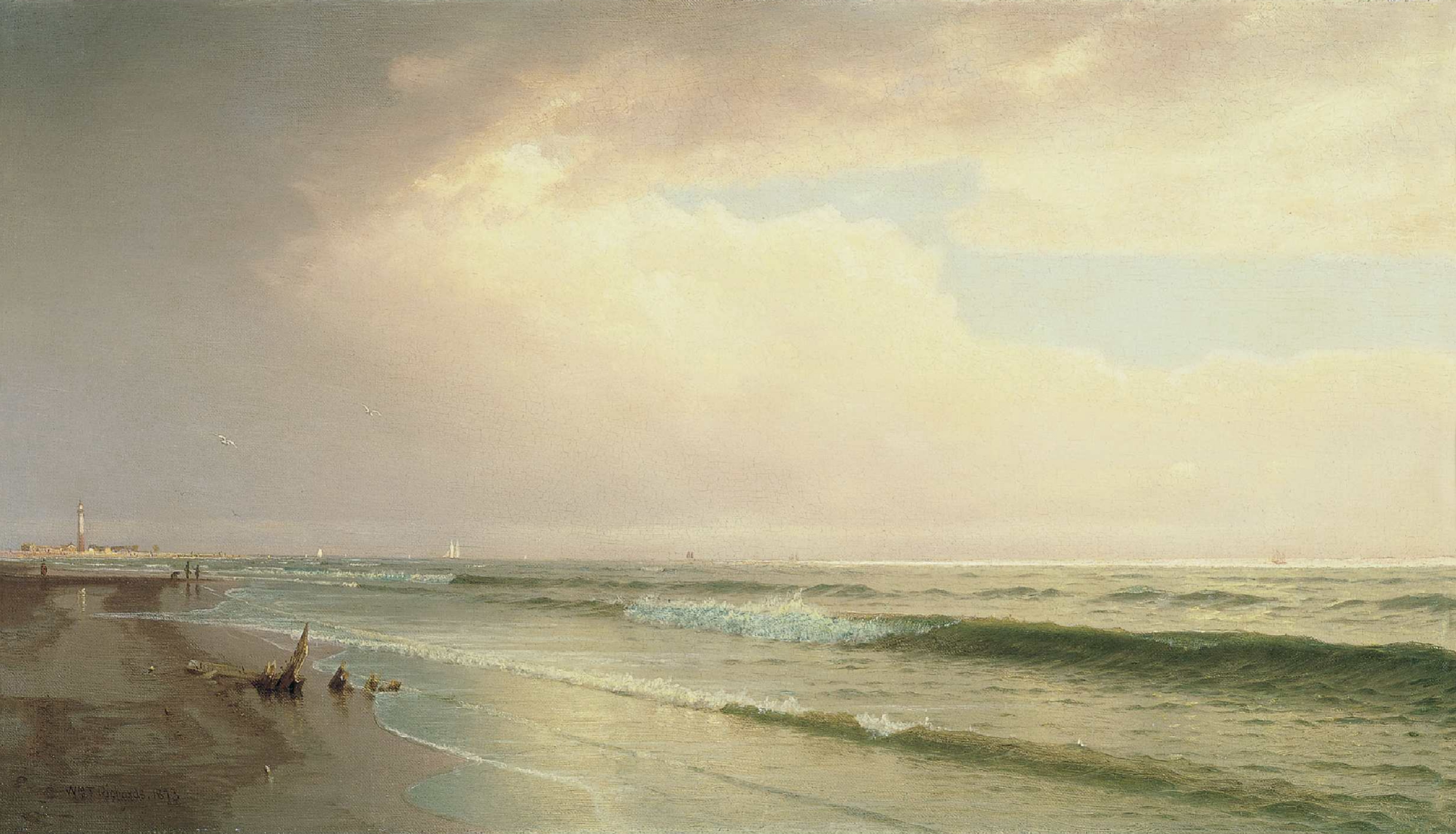
Seascape with Distant Lighthouse, Atlantic City, New Jersey, 1873, Thyssen-Bornemisza Museum

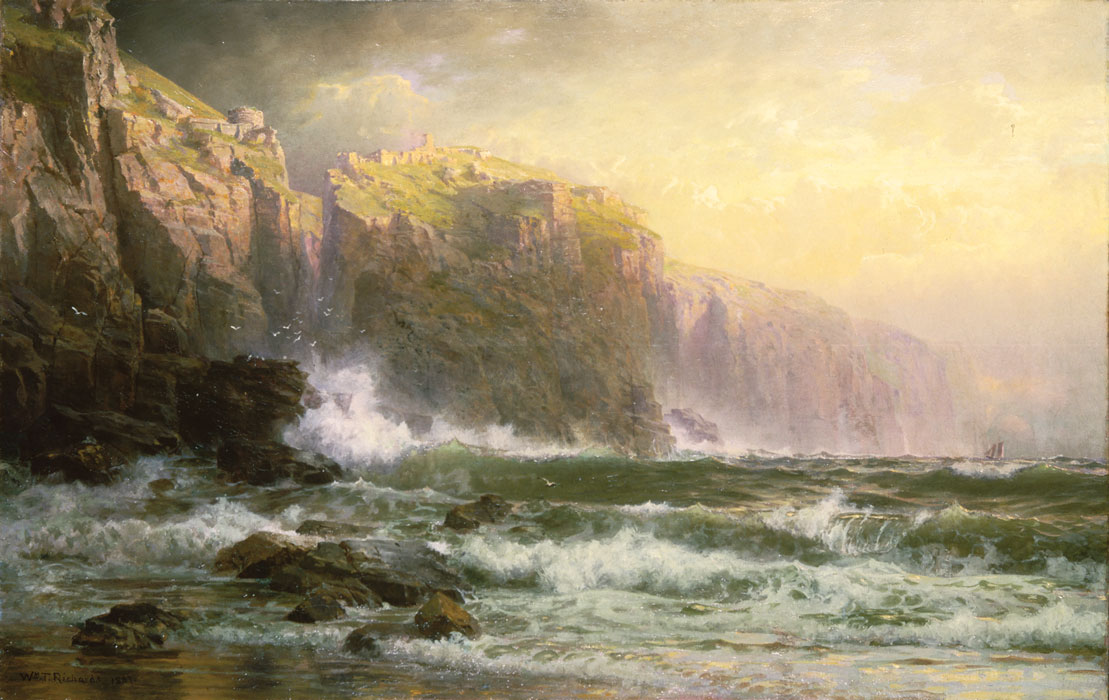
The League Long Breakers Thundering on the Reef, 1887, Brooklyn Museum

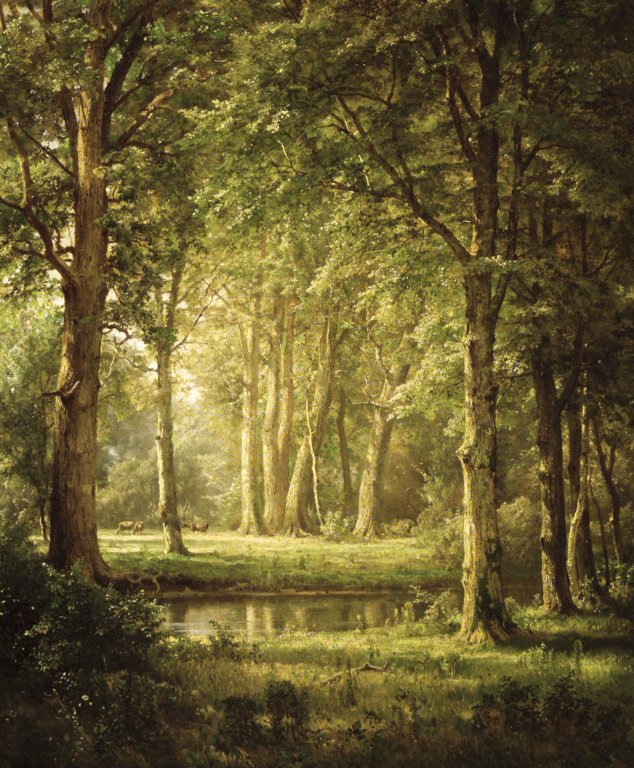
Early Summer, 1888, Brooklyn Museum

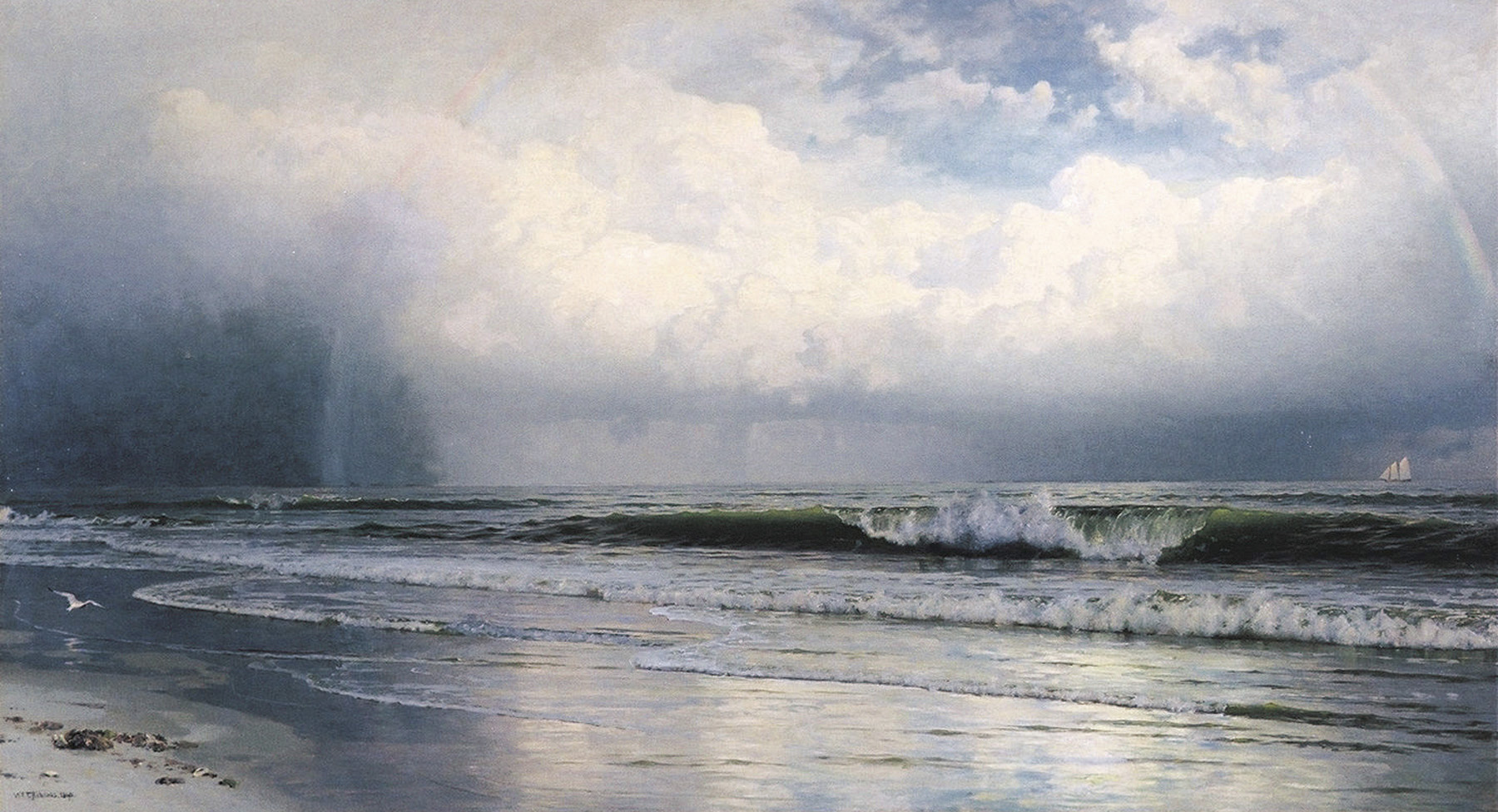
The Rainbow, 1890, Minnesota Marine Art Museum

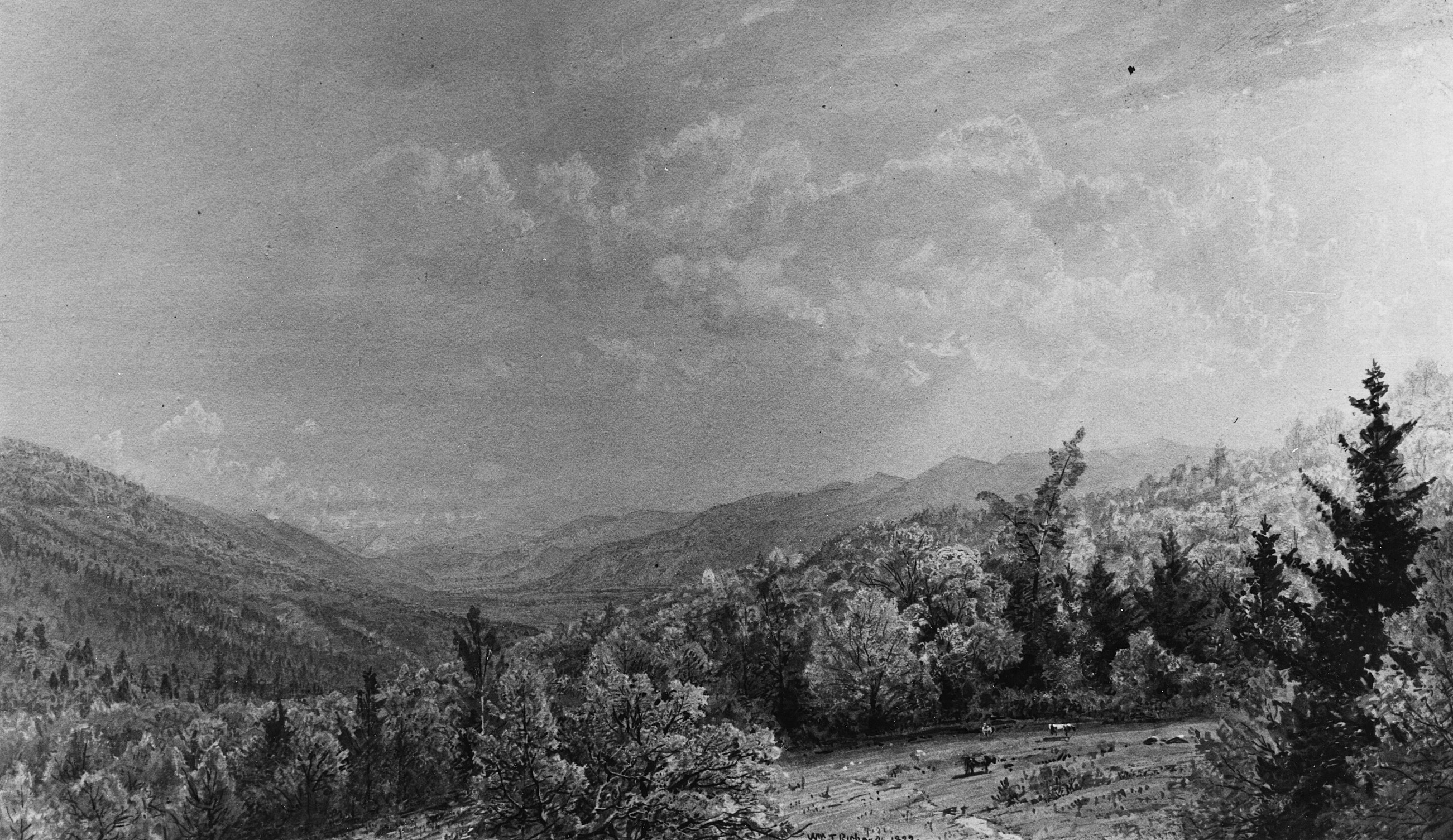
From the Flume House, Franconia, New Hampshire, 1872, Metropolitan Museum of Art

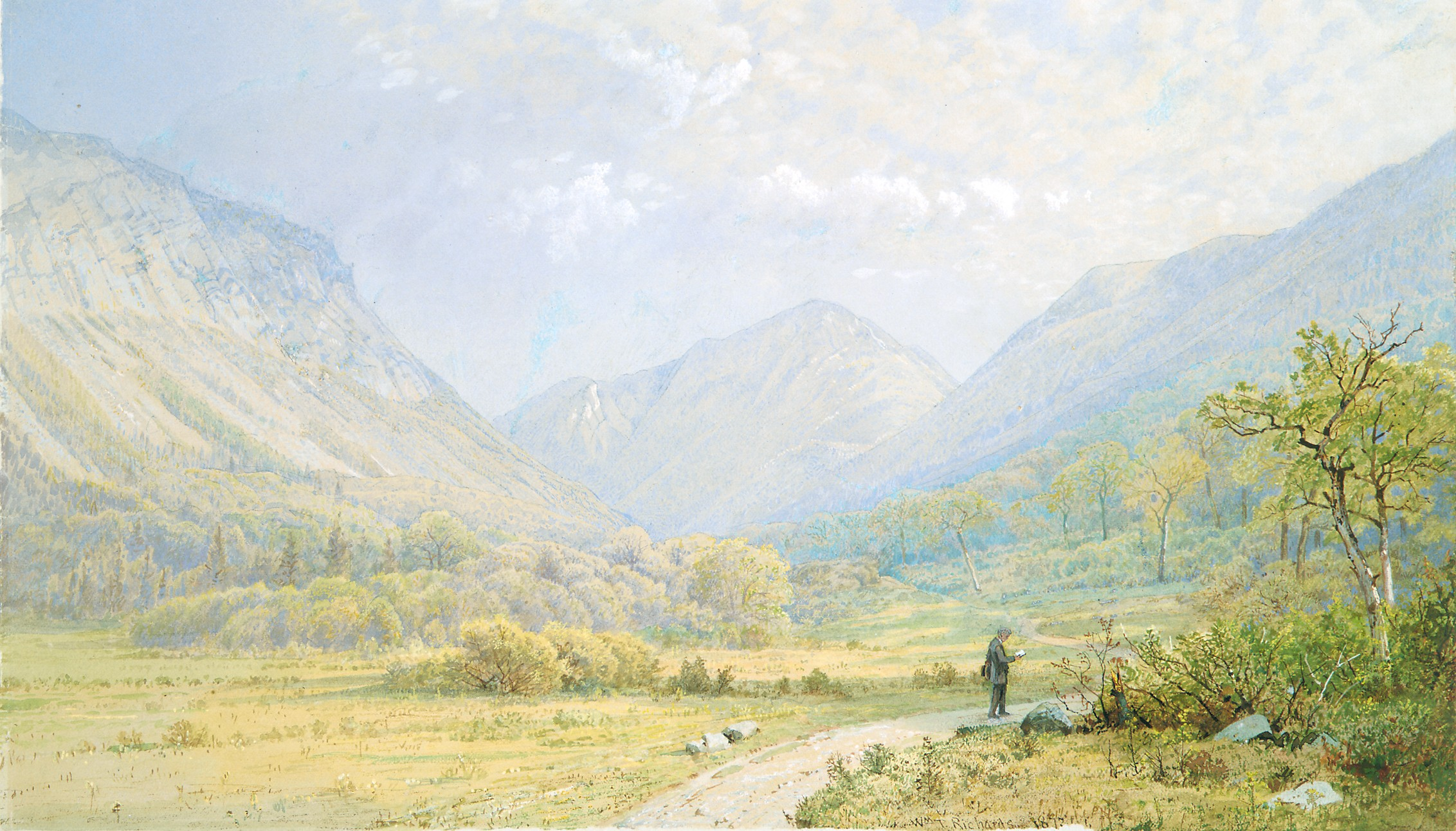
Franconia Notch, New Hampshire, 1872, Metropolitan Museum of Art

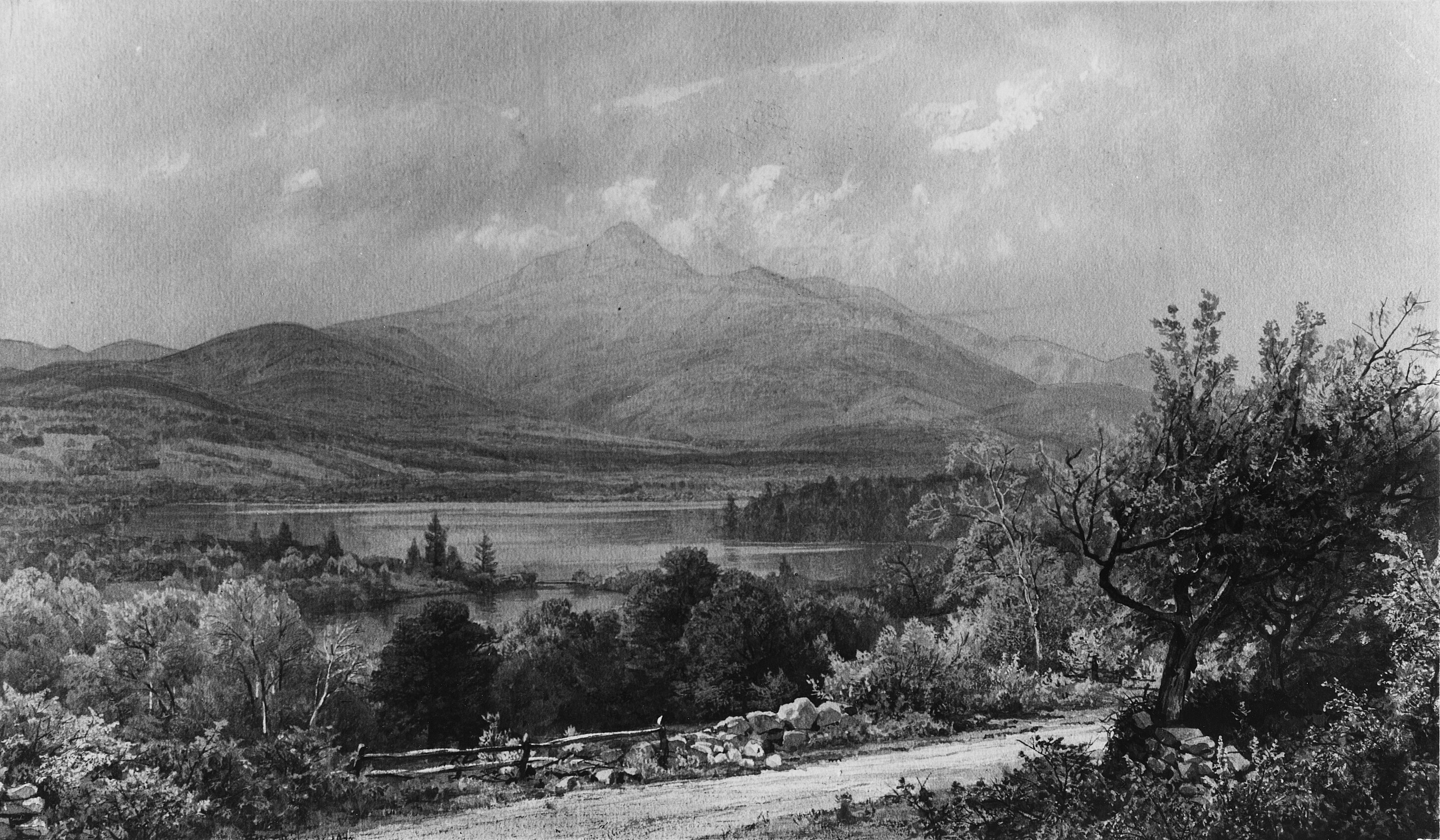
Mount Chocorua and Lake, 1873, Metropolitan Museum of Art

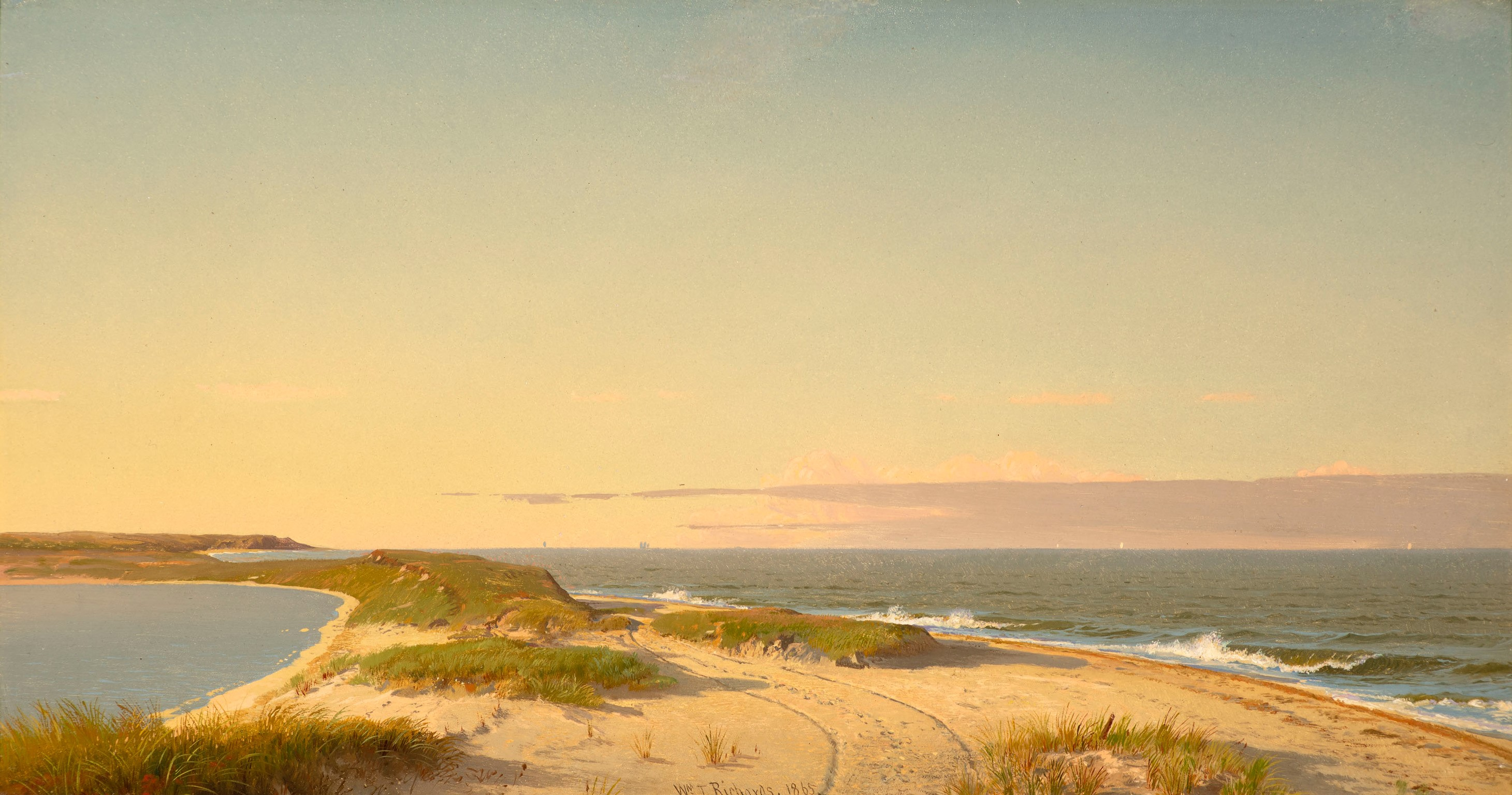
Nantucket Shore, 1865, Nantucket Historical Association

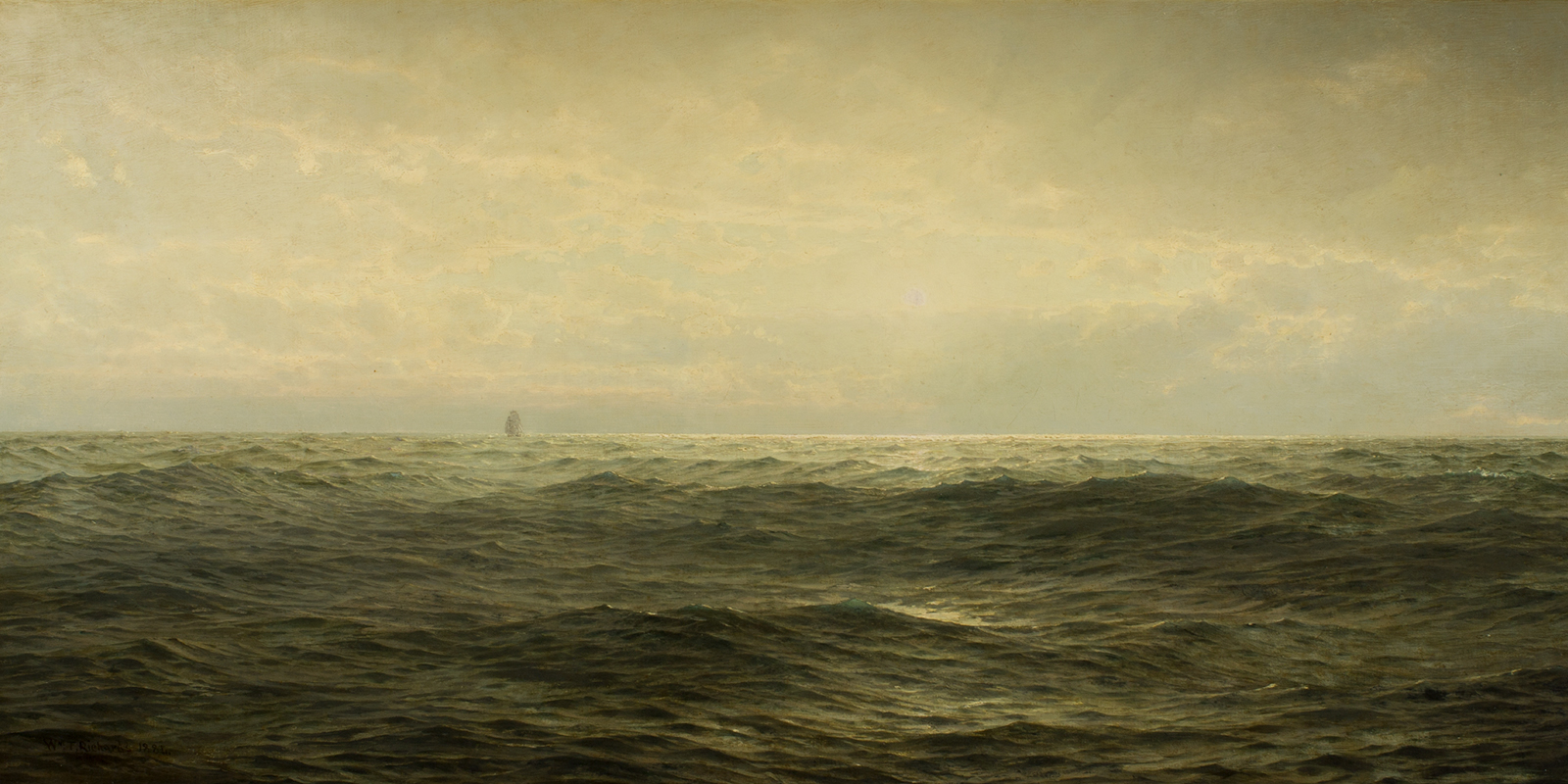
Marine, 1884, Portland Art Museum
