= James Jorgenson =

James W Jorgenson
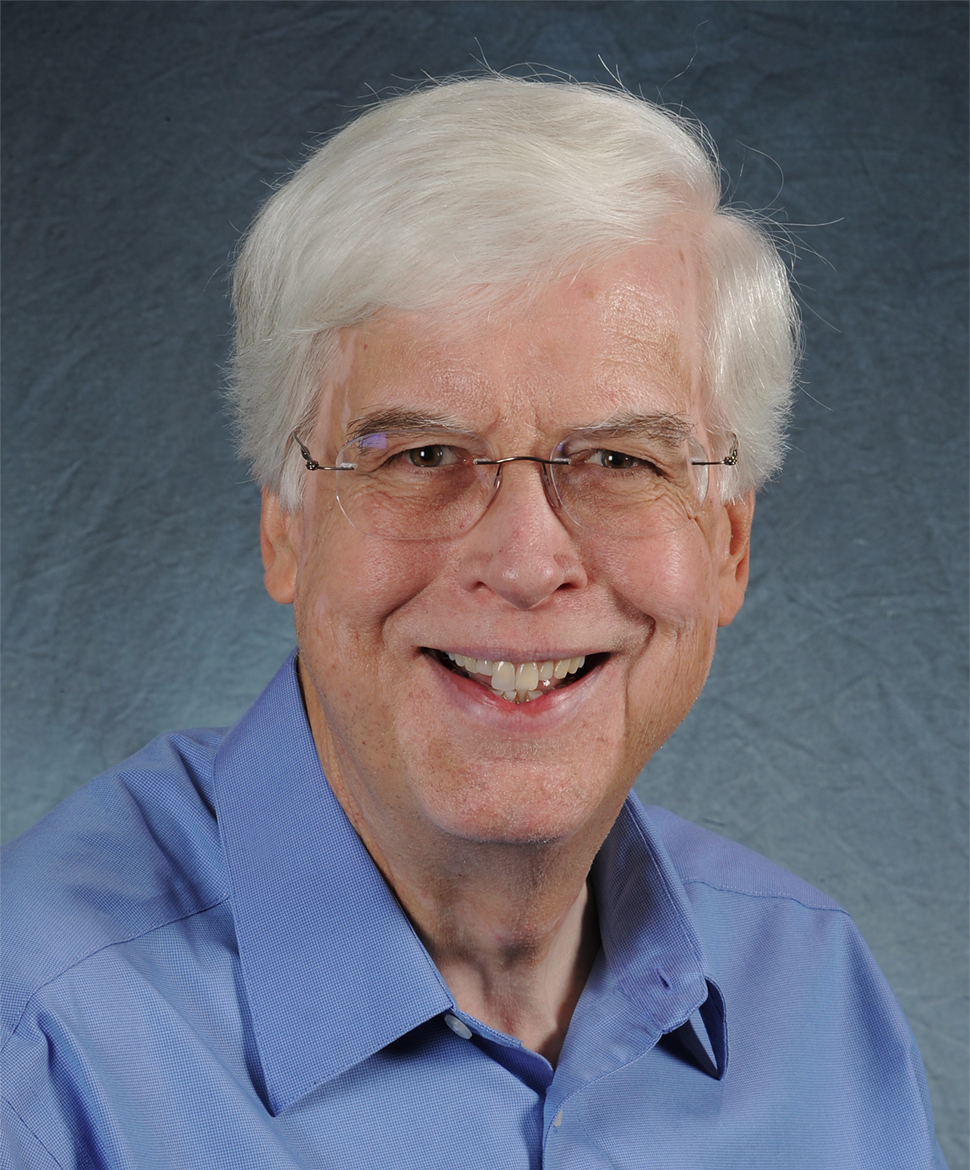
- Born: September 9, 1952 (age 73); Kenosha, Wisconsin
- Education: Northern Illinois University (1970–1974; B.S., 1974) Indiana University (1974–1979; Ph.D., 1979)
- Scientific career
- Fields: Analytical Separations, Capillary Electrophoresis, Capillary Liquid Chromatography
- Institutions: University of North Carolina at Chapel Hill
- Doctoral advisor: Milos Novotny

James Wallace Jorgenson is an American academic who previously held the position of William Rand Kenan Jr. Distinguished Professor of Chemistry at UNC-Chapel Hill. He is best known for his work developing capillary zone electrophoresis, and is a member of the American Academy of Arts and Sciences.

== Early life and education ==
Jorgenson was born on September 9, 1952, in Kenosha, Wisconsin. He received a Bachelor of Science degree in chemistry from Northern Illinois University in 1974 and a PhD in chemistry from Indiana University in 1979.

== Research interests ==
Jorgenson's research group is focused on utilizing analytical separation techniques to solve research problems in complex mixture analysis. The group currently focuses on ultra-high pressure capillary liquid chromatography combined with mass spectrometry (MS).

Jorgenson's research group is best known for their breakthrough in the field of separation sciences, the invention of capillary electrophoresis (CE). He began his research at UNC Chapel Hill studying electro-osmotically driven chromatography. The development of CE has aided in the advancement of many fields of science, including DNA sequencing, forensic DNA analysis and analysis of intact proteins. CE technology enabled completion of the sequencing of the human genome far ahead of the expected schedule and far below anticipated cost.

Jorgenson's research group is also notable for some of the earliest demonstrations of the analysis of the contents of single cells, comprehensive two-dimensional separations, and the invention of ultra-high pressure liquid chromatography. His publications in separation methods have been extensively cited.

Jorgenson retired in 2019 from the University of North Carolina at Chapel Hill. He was awarded the American Chemical Society Award in Separations Science and Technology.

== Honors received ==
- American Chemical Society Award in Separations Science and Technology, 2021
- Special issue of the "Journal of Chromatography A" honoring James Jorgenson, November 2017
- Lifetime Achievement Award, LCGC Magazine North America, 2011
- American Chemical Society Award in Analytical Chemistry, 2007
- Elected Member of the American Academy of Arts and Sciences, 2007
- Lifetime Achievement Award, LCGC Magazine Europe, 2006
- Special issue of the journal "Electrophoresis" dedicated to J. W. Jorgenson, October 2001
- American Chemical Society Award in Chromatography, 1993

== Patents ==
- "Coaxial Flow Post Capillary Mixing", J.W. Jorgenson and D.J. Rose, U.S. Patent No. 4,936,974.
- "Microelectrospray Method and Apparatus", J.W. Jorgenson and D.M. Dohmeier, U.S. Patent No. 5,115,131.
- "Two-Dimensional High-Performance Liquid Chromatography/Capillary Electrophoresis", J.W. Jorgenson and M.M. Bushey, U.S. Patent No. 5,131,998.
- "Two-Dimensional High-Performance Liquid Chromatography/Capillary Electrophoresis", J.W. Jorgenson and M.M. Bushey, U.S. Patent No. 5,240,577.
- "Method and Device for High Speed Separation of Complex Molecules", J.W. Jorgenson and C.A. Monnig, U.S. Patent No. 5,269,900.
- "Two-Dimensional Separation System", J.W. Jorgenson and A.V. Lemmo, U.S. Patent No. 5,389,221.
- "Two-Dimensional Separation System", J.W. Jorgenson and A.V. Lemmo, U.S. Patent No. 5,496,460.
- “Sample injector system for liquid chromatography”, Gerhardt; Geoff C., Jorgenson; James W., Fadgen; Keith, U.S. Patent No. 8,173,070
