= Walter Jennings (footballer) =

English footballer

Personal information
- Full name: Walter Jennings
- Date of birth: 20 October 1897
- Place of birth: Grimsby, England
- Date of death: 15 November 1971 (aged 74)
- Position: Goalkeeper

Senior career*
Years	Team	Apps	(Gls)
1918–1919	Welholme Old Boys		
1919–1920	Grimsby Town	2	(0)
1920–1922	Swansea Town	3	(0)
1922–1924	Southend United	15	(0)
1924–1925	Boston Town		
1925–1926	Blackpool	4	(0)
- * Club domestic league appearances and goals

Walter Jennings (20 October 1897 – 15 November 1970) was an English professional footballer who played as a goalkeeper.
