= Barium perchlorate =

Identifiers
CAS Number	13465-95-7
3D model (JSmol)	Interactive image
ChemSpider	55531
ECHA InfoCard	100.033.359
EC Number	236-710-4
PubChem CID	61623
RTECS number	SC7550000
UNII	EY48PA0C98
CompTox Dashboard (EPA)	DTXSID90890699
- InChI: InChI=1S/Ba.2ClHO4/c;2*2-1(3,4)5/h;2*(H,2,3,4,5)/q+2;;/p-2 Key: OOULUYZFLXDWDQ-UHFFFAOYSA-L
- SMILES: [O-]Cl(=O)(=O)=O.[O-]Cl(=O)(=O)=O.[Ba+2]

Properties
Chemical formula	Ba(ClO_{4})_{2}
Molar mass	336.22 g·mol^{−1}
Appearance	white powder
Density	3.2 g/cm^{3}
Melting point	505 °C (941 °F; 778 K)
Solubility in water	66.48 g/100 mL (25 °C (77 °F; 298 K))

Hazards
NFPA 704 (fire diamond)	3 0 1 OX

Related compounds
Other anions	Barium chlorate; Barium chloride
Other cations	Magnesium perchlorate; Strontium perchlorate
- Except where otherwise noted, data are given for materials in their standard state (at 25 °C [77 °F], 100 kPa). Infobox references

Barium perchlorate is a powerful oxidizing agent, with the formula Ba(ClO_{4})_{2}. It is used in the pyrotechnic industry.

Barium perchlorate decomposes at 505 °C (941 °F).

== Structure ==
Gallucci and Gerkin (1988) analyzed the structure of the hydrate isomer barium perchlorate trihydrate (Ba(ClO_{4})_{2}·3H_{2}O) by X-ray crystallography. The barium ions are coordinated by six water oxygen atoms at 2.919 Å and six perchlorate oxygens at 3.026 Å in a distorted icosahedral arrangement. The perchlorate fails by a narrow margin to have regular tetrahedral geometry, and has an average Cl-O bond length of 1.433 Å. The space-group assignment of the structure was resolved, with the centrosymmetric assignment of P6_{3}/m confirmed. Each axial perchlorate oxygen is hydrogen bonded to three water molecules and each trigonal oxygen is hydrogen bonded to two water molecules. This interaction is the reason that the perchlorate fails to be tetrahedral. Gallucci and Gerkin surmised that the water molecule H atoms lie in the plane at z = 1/4 and 3/4.

== Preparation ==
Barium perchlorate can be prepared using many different reagents and methods. One method involves evaporating a solution containing barium chloride and an excess of perchloric acid. The dihydrate form is produced by recrystallizing and drying to a constant weight. Additional drying over sulfuric acid yields the monohydrate. The anhydrous form is obtained by heating to 140 °C (284 °F) in vacuum. Dehydration of barium perchlorate that does not occur in vacuum will also result in hydrolysis of the perchlorate. Other reactions that produce barium perchlorate are as follows: perchloric acid and barium hydroxide or carbonate; potassium perchlorate and hydrofluosilicic acid followed with barium carbonate; boiling solution of potassium chlorate and zinc fluosilicate. For large-scale manufacturing purposes, barium perchlorate is synthesized by evaporating a solution of sodium perchlorate and barium chloride. Another method of preparation involves the digestion of a saturated solution of ammonium perchlorate with hydrated barium hydroxide in 5-10% excess of the theoretical amount.

== Applications ==
Due to its characteristic as a powerful oxidizing agent, one of barium perchlorate's primary uses is in the manufacture and preparation of explosive emulsions and other explosive compounds. Using an emulsifier makes the process of transporting and handling of the explosive material while still retaining its destructive properties at the end point of use. Perchlorate explosives were mainly used in industrial applications, such as mining during the 1920s. It is also used in pyrotechnics, where the barium produces a green color.

Barium perchlorate is also able to complex with the fluoroquinolone antibacterial agents ciprofloxacin and norfloxacin. FTIR data suggests that CIP and NOR act as bidentate ligands, using the ring carbonyl oxygen and an oxygen of the carboxylic group. This coordination is significant because it increases the solubility of the antibiotics in water and other polar solvents, increasing their uptake efficiency.

Because of its high solubility in water, anhydrous barium perchlorate can be used as a dehydrating reagent for other compounds. It saw extensive such use in the 1920s, because it was then relatively cheap to produce and easy to regenerate.

Barium perchlorate is also used for the determination of small concentrations (down to 10±1 ppm) of sulfate. In order for the titration to be successful, a high concentration of a nonaqueous solvent, such as ethyl alcohol, 2-propanol, or methanol, must be present. Thorin is typically used as the indicator.
