= Electrophoresis (journal) =

- Discipline: Biochemistry, analytical chemistry
- Language: English
- Edited by: Blanca H. Lapizco-Encinas and Hermann Wätzig

Publication details
- History: 1980–present
- Publisher: Wiley-VCH
- Frequency: Biweekly
- Impact factor: 2.9 (2022)

Standard abbreviations
- ISO 4: Electrophoresis

Indexing
- CODEN: ELCTDN
- ISSN: 0173-0835 (print); 1522-2683 (web)
- LCCN: 83640492
- OCLC no.: 7297725

Links
- Journal homepage; Online access; Online archive

Electrophoresis is a peer-reviewed scientific journal covering all aspects of electrophoresis, including new or improved analytical and preparative methods, development of theory, and innovative applications of electrophoretic methods in the study of proteins, nucleic acids, and other compounds.

== Abstracting and indexing ==
The journal is abstracted and indexed in:

- Advanced Polymer Abstracts
- AGRICOLA
- Animal Breeding Abstracts
- Biochemistry & Biophysics Citation Index
- Biological Abstracts
- BIOSIS Previews
- CAB Abstracts
- CAB HEALTH
- CAB Direct
- Cambridge Scientific Abstracts
- Civil Engineering Abstracts
- Current Contents/Life Sciences
- EMBASE
- Global Health
- Index Medicus/MEDLINE/PubMed
- Inspec
- METADEX
- Science Citation Index
- Scopus

According to the Journal Citation Reports, the journal has a 2020 impact factor of 3.535, ranking it 27th out of 87 journals in the category "Chemistry, Analytical" and 29th out of 78 in the category "Biochemical Research Methods".
