= Milton L. Lee =

Milton L. Lee is the H. Tracy Hall Professor of Chemistry at Brigham Young University (BYU).

== Education ==
Lee received a B.A. degree in chemistry from the University of Utah in 1971 and a Ph.D. in analytical chemistry from Indiana University Bloomington in 1975, after which he spent one year (1975–76) at the Massachusetts Institute of Technology as a postdoctoral research associate. Upon leaving MIT, he accepted a faculty position in the Chemistry Department at Brigham Young University, where he is the H. Tracy Hall Professor of Chemistry.

== Achievements ==
Lee is best known for his research in capillary separations and mass spectrometry detection. He is an author or co-author of over 550 scientific publications. Among the scientific awards that he has received for his achievements in research and professional activities are the M.S. Tswett Chromatography Medal (1984), the Keene P. Dimick Chromatography Award (1988), the American Chemical Society Award in Chromatography (1988), the Russian Tswett Chromatography Medal (1992), the Martin Gold Medal (1996), the Latin-American Chromatography Congress Medal (1998), the M.J.E. Golay Award (1998), the American Chemical Society Award in Chemical Instrumentation (1998), an honorary doctorate from Uppsala University in Sweden (1998), the Dal Nogare Award (1999), the Eastern Analytical Symposium Award for Achievements in Separation Science (1999), the California Separation Science Society Award (2005), the Pittsburgh Analytical Chemistry Award (2008), R&D 100 Awards (1993, 2008), Eastern Analytical Symposium Award for Outstanding Achievements in the Fields of Analytical Chemistry (2008), the American Chemical Society Award in Separations Science and Technology (2012), and the LC/GC Europe Lifetime Achievement Award (2014).

He is also an entrepreneur and has been involved in transferring technology from his university research laboratory to the private sector. In 1984, he co-founded Lee Scientific to develop and market supercritical fluid chromatographic instrumentation and, in 1991, he co-founded Sensar Corporation to develop and market unique time-of-flight mass spectrometry instrumentation. He is a co-founder of Torion Technologies, which markets a hand-portable gas chromatography-mass spectrometry system. He is listed as a co-inventor on twenty issued patents.
