= Theodore William Richards =

American chemist and Nobel laureate (1868–1928)

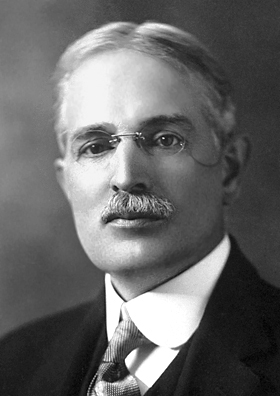
- Richards in 1914
- Born: January 31, 1868; Germantown, Pennsylvania, U.S
- Died: April 2, 1928 (aged 60); Cambridge, Massachusetts, U.S
- Education: Haverford College; Harvard University
- Known for: Atomic weights Thermochemistry; Electrochemistry
- Awards: Davy Medal (1910); Willard Gibbs Award (1912); Nobel Prize for Chemistry (1914); Franklin Medal (1916)
- Scientific career
- Fields: Physical chemistry
- Workplaces: Harvard University
- Doctoral advisor: Josiah Parsons Cooke(see Kopperl: "Theodore W. Richards: America's First Nobel Laureate Chemist", in Profiles in Chemistry, in Journal of Chemical Education, 1983, Vol. 60, Issue 9, page 738.
- Doctoral students: Gilbert N. Lewis; Farrington Daniels; Malcolm Dole; Charles Phelps Smyth; Hobart Hurd Willard; James B. Conant

Theodore William Richards (January 31, 1868 – April 2, 1928) was an American physical chemist and the first American scientist to receive the Nobel Prize in Chemistry, earning the award "in recognition of his exact determinations of the atomic weights of a large number of the chemical elements."

== Biography ==
Theodore Richards was born in Germantown, Pennsylvania, to William Trost Richards, a land- and seascape painter, and Anna Matlack Richards, a poet. Richards received most of his pre-college education from his mother. During one summer's stay at Newport, Rhode Island, Richards met Professor Josiah Parsons Cooke of Harvard, who showed the young boy Saturn's rings through a small telescope. Years later Cooke and Richards would work together in Cooke's laboratory.

Beginning in 1878, the Richards family spent two years in Europe, largely in England, where Theodore Richards' scientific interests grew stronger. After the family's return to the United States, he entered Haverford College, Pennsylvania in 1883 at the age of 14, earning a Bachelor of Science degree in 1885. He then enrolled at Harvard University and received a Bachelor of Arts degree in 1886, as further preparation for graduate studies.

Richards continued on at Harvard, taking as his dissertation topic the determination of the atomic weight of oxygen relative to hydrogen. His doctoral advisor was Josiah Parsons Cooke. Next he performed a year of post-doctoral work in Germany, where he studied under Victor Meyer at the University of Göttingen and others. Richards returned to Harvard as an assistant in chemistry, then instructor, assistant professor, and finally full professor in 1901. He became one of the first American scientists ever offered a full professorship in a major European university, from Göttingen, in 1901, but instead of taking the position, he chose to continue in America. In 1903 he became chairman of the department of chemistry at Harvard, and in 1912 he was appointed Erving Professor of Chemistry and director of the new Wolcott Gibbs Memorial Laboratory.

In 1896, Richards married Miriam Stuart Thayer. The couple had one daughter, Grace Thayer (who married James Bryant Conant), and two sons, Greenough Thayer and William Theodore. Both sons died by suicide.

Richards maintained interests in both art and music. Among his recreations were sketching, golf, and sailing. He died at Cambridge, Massachusetts, on April 2, 1928, at the age of 60. According to one of his descendants, Richards suffered from "chronic respiratory problems and a prolonged depression."

He was a Quaker.

== Scientific research ==
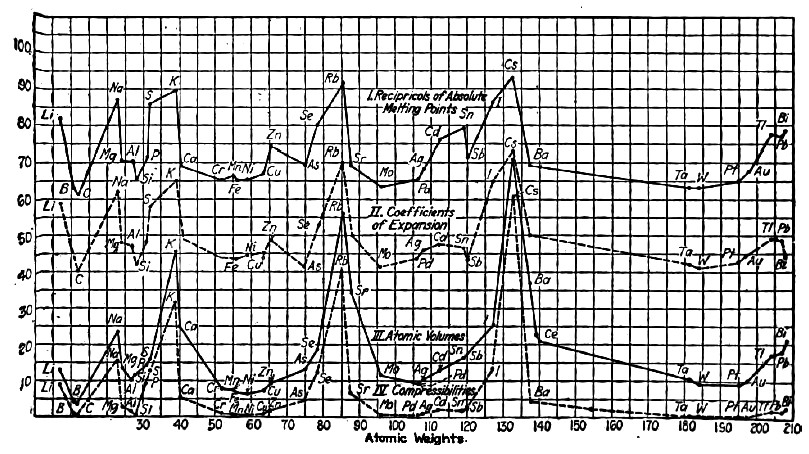
Graph of periodic properties by Richards

About half of Richards's scientific research concerned atomic weights, starting in 1886 with his graduate studies. On returning to Harvard in 1889, this was his first line of research, continuing up to his death. According to Forbes, by 1932 the atomic weights of 55 elements had been studied by Richards and his students. Among the potential sources of error Richards uncovered in such determinations was the tendency of certain salts to occlude gases or foreign solutes on precipitation. As an example of the care Richards used in his work, Emsley reports that he carried out 15,000 recrystallizations of thulium bromate in order to obtain the pure element thulium for an atomic weight measurement.

Richards was the first to show, by chemical analysis, that an element could have different atomic weights. He was asked to analyze samples of naturally occurring lead and lead produced by radioactive decay. His measurements showed that the two samples had different atomic weights, supporting the concepts of isotopes.

Other scientific work of Theodore Richards included investigations of the compressibilities of atoms, heats of solution and neutralization, and the electrochemistry of amalgams. His investigation of electrochemical potentials at low temperatures was among the work that led, in the hands of others, to the Nernst heat theorem and the Third law of thermodynamics, although not without heated debate between Nernst and Richards.

Richards also is credited with the invention of the adiabatic calorimeter as well as the nephelometer, which was devised for his work on the atomic weight of strontium.

== Legacy and honors ==
- Member of the American Philosophical Society (1902)
- Lowell Lectures (1908)
- Davy Medal (1910)
- Faraday Lectureship (1911)
- Willard Gibbs Medal (1912)
- President of the American Chemical Society (1914)
- Nobel Prize in Chemistry (1914)
- Franklin Medal (1916)
- President of the American Association for the Advancement of Science (1917)
- Honorary Member of the Royal Irish Academy (1918)
- Foreign Member of the Royal Society of London (1919)
- President of the American Academy of Arts and Sciences President (1919 – 1921)
- Lavoisier Medal (1922)
- Le Blanc Medal (1922)
- Honorary Fellow of the Royal Society of Edinburgh (1923)
- Member of the International Atomic Weights Committee
- Theodore Richards Medal (1932, awarded posthumously) The Theodore William Richards Medal is awarded every two years to an outstanding chemist by the Northeastern Section of the American Chemical Society. The award was established in 1928. American sculptor and friend Cyrus Dallin designed the medal and his original plaster can be seen at the Cyrus Dallin Art Museum in Arlington, Massachusetts.

== Selected writings ==
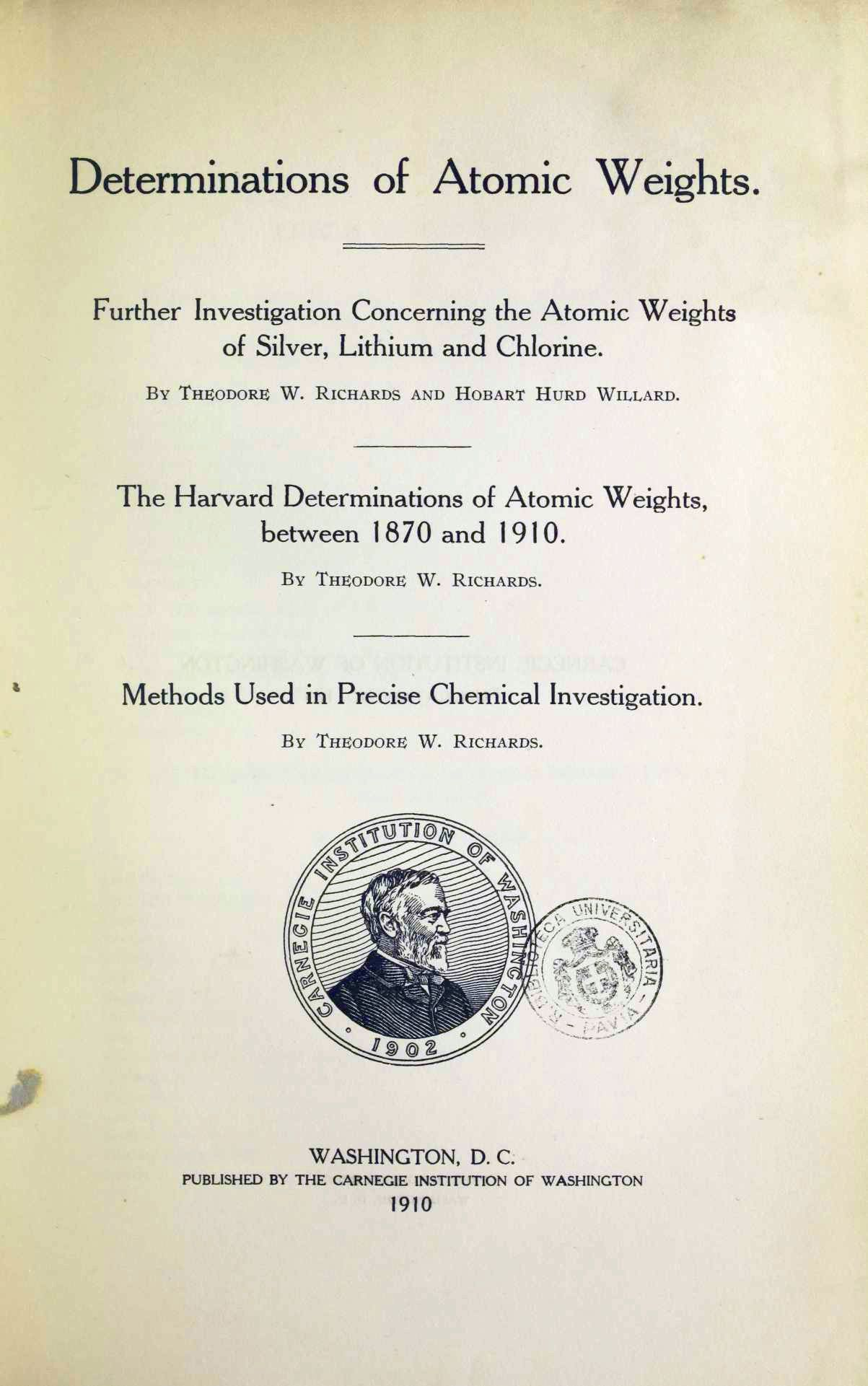
Determinations of atomic weights, 1910

- Richards, Theodore W.; Forbes, George Shannon (1906). "Energy Changes Involved in the Dilution of Zinc and Cadmium Amalgams". Carnegie Institution Report. Carnegie Institution of Washington: 1–68. "theodore richards atomic."
- Determinations of atomic weights. Washington: Carnagie Institution of Washington. 1910.
- Richards, Theodore W. (1913). The Scientific Work of Morris Loeb. Harvard University Press. "theodore richards."
- Richards, Theodore W. (1915). "Concerning the Compressibilities of the Elements, and Their Relations to Other Properties". Journal of the American Chemical Society. 37 (7). American Chemical Society: 1643–1656. Bibcode:1915JAChS..37.1643R. doi:10.1021/ja02172a001. PMC 1090843. PMID 16576032.

== See also ==
- Mass spectrometry
- Jöns Jakob Berzelius
- Farrington Daniels
- Gilbert Newton Lewis
- Jean Stas
- Theodore W. Richards House
