= Timo Righetti =

Swiss footballer (born 1998)

Personal information
- Full name: Timo Raphael Righetti
- Date of birth: 2 May 1998 (age 28)
- Place of birth: Switzerland
- Height: 1.79 m (5 ft 10 in)
- Position: Centre back

Youth career
- 2007–2009: FC Wabern
- 2009–2015: Young Boys
- 2015–2017: Thun

Senior career*
Years	Team	Apps	(Gls)
2017–2020	Thun	12	(0)
2020	Breitenrain	0	(0)

International career
2018	Switzerland U20	1	(0)
- * Club domestic league appearances and goals as of 22 July 2018

Timo Raphael Righetti (born 2 May 1998) is a Swiss professional footballer who plays as a defender.

== Professional career ==
Righetti made his professional debut for Thun in a 3-1 Swiss Super League win over BSC Young Boys on 3 December 2017.

== International career ==
Righetti is a youth international for Switzerland.
