= Milos Novotny =

American chemist (born 1942)

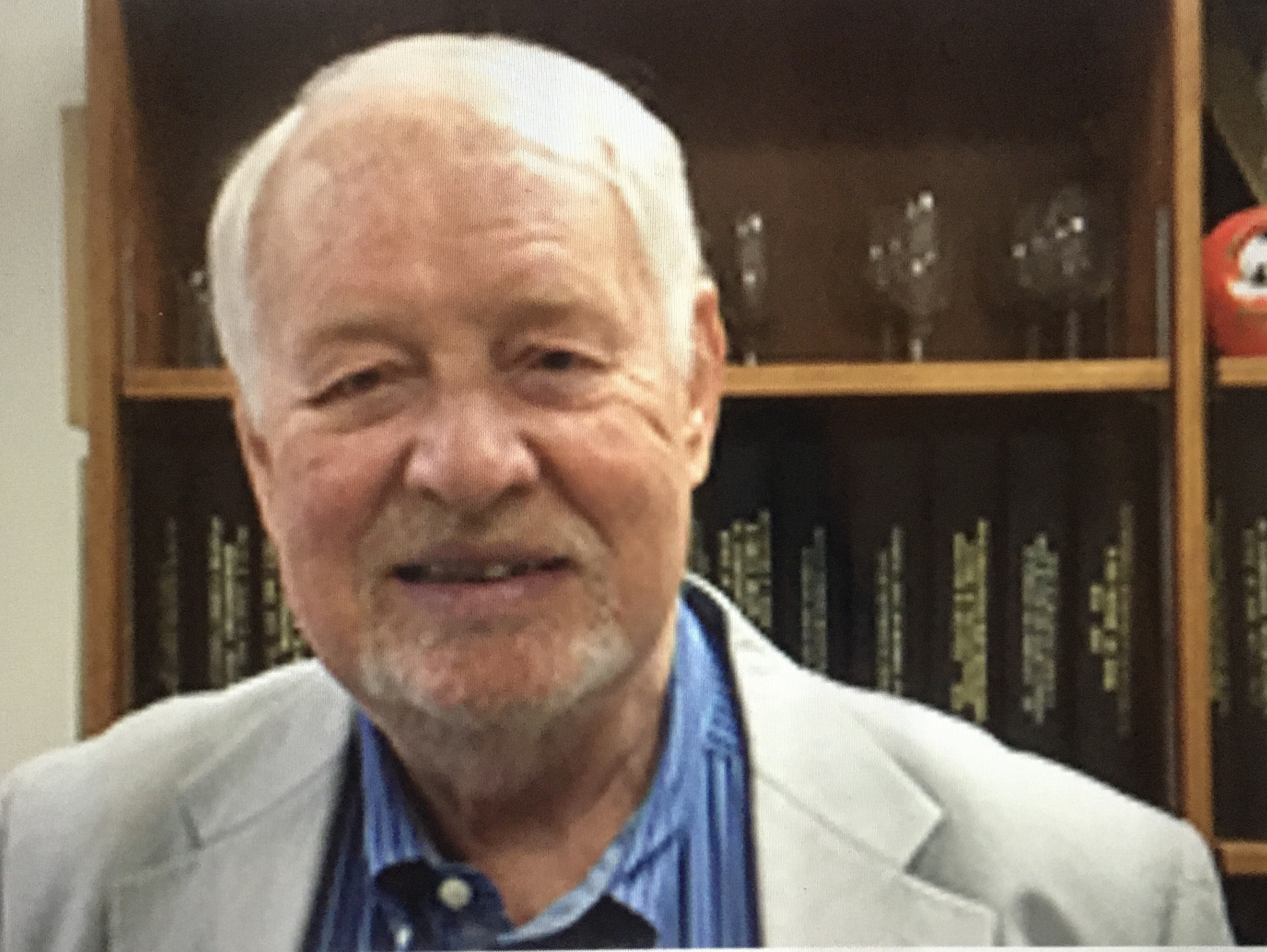

Milos Vratislav Novotny (born 19 April 1942) is an American chemist, currently the Distinguished Professor Emeritus and Director of the Novotny Glycoscience Laboratory and the Institute for Pheromone Research at Indiana University, and also a published author. Milos Novotny received his Bachelor of Science from the University of Brno, Czechoslovakia in 1962. In 1965, Novotny received his Ph.D. at the University of Brno. Novotny also holds honorary doctorates from Uppsala University, Masaryk University and Charles University, and he has been a major figure in analytical separation methods. Novotny was recognized for the development of PAGE Polyacrylamide Gel-filled Capillaries for Capillary Electrophoresis in 1993. In his years of work dedicated to analytical chemistry he has earned a reputation for being especially innovative in the field and has contributed a great deal to several analytical separation methods. Most notably, Milos has worked a great deal with microcolumn separation techniques of liquid chromatography, supercritical fluid chromatography, and capillary electrophoresis. Additionally, he is known for his research in proteomics and glycoanalysis and for identifying the first mammalian pheromones.

== Awards ==
In 1986, Novotny was given the Award in Chromatography from the American Chemical Society. Novotny received the ANACHEM award in 1992. This award is given to outstanding analytical chemists for teaching, research, administration or other activities which have advanced of the field. Novotny was also selected as the LCGC Lifetime Achievement award recipient in 2019.

=== Awards received in the 1980s ===
Chairman, Gordon Research Conference on Analytical Chemistry; James B. Himes Merit Award of the Chicago Chromatography Discussion Group; M.S. Tswett Award and Medal in Chromatography; American Chemical Society Award in Chromatography; ISCO Award in Biochemical Instrumentation; Eastern Analytical Symposium Award in Chromatography; Chemical Instrumentation Award of the American Chemical Society; Distinguished Faculty Research Lecture, Indiana University.

=== Awards received in the 1990s ===
Keene P. Dimick Award in Chromatography, Third International Symposium on Supercritical Fluid Chromatography Award for Pioneering Work in the Development of SFC; Marcel J.E. Golay Award and Medal, International Symposium on Capillary Chromatography; American Chemical Society Award in Separation Science and Technology; American Chemical Society Exceptional Achievement Award as a Capillary Gas Chromatography Short Course Instructor; R&D 100 Award for technologically significant new product: -PAGE Polyacrylamide Gel-filled Capillaries for Capillary Electrophoresis”; Jan E. Purkynje Memorial Medal of the Czech Academy of Sciences; R&D Magazine Scientist of the Year Award; M.S. Tswett Memorial Medal of the Russian Academy of Sciences; A.J.P. Martin Gold Medal of the Chromatographic Society of Great Britain; Theophilus Redwood Award, The Royal Society of Chemistry, Great Britain; Distinguished Teaching and Mentoring Award of the University Graduate School, Indiana University; Elected as a Foreign Member of the Royal Society of Sciences (Sweden); College of Arts & Sciences Distinguished Faculty Award, Indiana University.

=== Awards received in the 2000s ===
COLACRO (Congreso Latinoamericano de Cromatografia) Merit Medal; Pittsburgh Analytical Chemistry Award; Eastern Analytical Symposium Award for Outstanding Achievements in the Fields of Analytical Chemistry; Tracy M. Sonneborn Award for Outstanding Research and Teaching, Indiana University; Dal Nogare Award in Chromatography; CaSSS (California Separation Science Society) Award for Excellence in Separation Science; Honorary Member of the Slovak Pharmaceutical Society; Foreign Member of the Learned Society of the Czech Republic (Czech Academy of Sciences); American Chemical Society Award in Analytical Chemistry; Jan Weber Prize and Medal, Slovak Pharmaceutical Society, Slovakia; Ralph N. Adams Award in Bioanalytical Chemistry.

=== Awards received in the 2010s ===
Honorary Membership of the Czech Society for Mass Spectrometry; Lifetime Achievement Award in Chromatography by the LC-GC Magazine, Europe; Giorgio Nota Award, Italian Chemical Society; Heyrovsky Medal in Chemical Sciences, Prague, Czech Republic.

== Faculty Positions ==
On the faculty of Indiana University, Bloomington, since 1971. 1978 – Professor of Chemistry. 1980 – Visiting Scientist, Department of Immunogenetics, Max Planck Institute for Biology, Tübingen, Germany. 1988 – James H. Rudy Professor of Chemistry. 1999 – Distinguished Professor of Chemistry. 1999 – Director of the Institute for Pheromone Research. 2000–2015 – Lilly Chemistry Alumni Chair. 2004 – Adjunct Professor of Medicine, Indiana University School of Medicine. 2004–2009 – Director of the National Center for Glycomics and Glycoproteomics. 2010 – Director of the Novotny Glycoscience Laboratory. 2011 – Distinguished Professor Emeritus of Chemistry.

== Other Activities ==
- 1972–1975 – Associate Member, Viking Lander Science Team, NASA
- 1979–1982 – – Member, Committee on Response Strategies to Unusual Chemical Hazards, Assembly of Life Sciences, National Research Council
- 1982 – U.S. Coordinator, U.S.-Japan Joint Seminar on “Microcolumn Separation Methods and their Ancillary Techniques,” Honolulu, Hawaii
- 1980–1984 – Member, Advisory Committee to the Analytical Chemistry Division, Oak Ridge National Laboratory
- 1986 – Instructor, ACS Short Course on Supercritical Fluid Chromatography
- 1988, 1990 – Organizing Committee, International Symposium, “Microcolumn Separation Methods,” Bloomington, IN and Aronberg, Sweden
- 1988, 1991 – Scientific Committee, International Symposium, “HPLC 88” and “HPLC 92”
- 1977–Pres. – Instructor, ACS Short Course on Capillary Gas Chromatography
- 1978–Pres. – ACS Lecture Tour Speaker
- 1990–Pres. – Scientific Committee, International Symposia on Capillary Chromatography
- 1994 – Scientific Committee, Glycobiology: Analytical Methods
- 2003 – Member of the Center for the Integrative Study of Animal Behavior, Indiana University
- 2004 – Member of the Indiana University Cancer Center, IU School of Medicine

.

== Publications ==
- Separation of amino acid homopolymers by capillary gel electrophoresis.
- Retention indices for programmed-temperature capillary-column gas chromatography of polycyclic aromatic hydrocarbons.
- Ultrasensitive Pheromone Detection by mammalian vomeronasal neurons.
- Electrophoretic separations of proteins in capillaries with hydrolytically-stable surface structures.
- Comparison of the methods for profiling glycoprotein glycans—HUPO Human Disease Glycomics/Proteome Initiative multi-institutional study.
- Structural Investigations of Glycoconjugates at High Sensitivity.
