= Walter Jennings (chemist) =

Walter Goodrich Jennings (March 2, 1922 – July 5, 2012) was an American chemist, educator and entrepreneur. He was co-founder of J&W Scientific, which became the world's largest supplier of fused silica columns; the company was purchased by Agilent Technologies in 2000.

He was born in Sioux City, Iowa and grew up in Glendale, California. From 1940 to 1942, Jennings worked on a survey crew for the Union Pacific Railroad. He served with the United States Army in Europe during World War II. With the aid of the GI Bill, Jennings enrolled at the University of California, Davis with the aim of earning a degree in dairy science. He earned a Bachelor, Masters and PhD, eventually becoming a professor emeritus. His interest in flavor chemistry led him to investigate technologies such as gas chromatography to help investigate the chemistry behind the flavor. This led to technological innovations in support of gas chromatography including the production of fused silica (glass) capillary columns for separation of chemical compounds through this specialized analytical chemistry technique. Jennings and a graduate student began manufacturing capillary columns for gas chromatography; originally operating out of a garage, they went on to form a manufacturing company J & W Scientific based in Folsom, CA.

Jennings produced over 200 publications in his field and was also in demand as a lecturer. He was awarded a Humboldt Fellowship in 1973, the Founders Award in Gas Chromatography from the Beckman Foundation, the M.J.E. Golay Award, the Keene P. Dimick Award, and the A.J.P. Martin Gold Medal from the Chromatographic Society. In 2004, he received the ANACHEM Award. He also received the Lifetime Achievement Award in 2008 from LCGC (Liquid Chromatography-Gas Chromatography). Jennings was chairman of the American Chemical Society Flavor Chemistry and Chromatography and Separation Science subdivisions.

Jennings died at home at the age of 90.
