= Journal of Chromatography B =

Academic journal in analytical chemistry

- Discipline: Analytical Chemistry
- Language: English
- Edited by: David S. Hage

Publication details
- History: 1958-present
- Publisher: Elsevier (United States)
- Impact factor: 3.205 (2020)

Standard abbreviations
- ISO 4: J. Chromatogr. B

Indexing
- ISSN: 1570-0232

Links
- Journal homepage

The Journal of Chromatography B is a peer-reviewed scientific journal publishing research papers in analytical chemistry, with a focus on chromatography techniques and methods in the biological and life sciences. According to the Journal Citation Reports, Journal of Chromatography B has a 2020 impact factor of 3.205, ranking it 36th out of 83 in the category of Chemistry, Analytical.

== See also ==
- Journal of Chromatography A
