= G. Frederick Smith =

American chemist

George Frederick Smith (1891–1976) was an early American researcher and advocate of the use of perchloric acid and perchlorate salts in analytical chemistry. He authored and co-authored many scholarly papers and textbooks on the subject.

In the 1930s, Smith and one of his students explored the use of expanding pressurized gas to create foams. They developed this technology into Instantwhip, in which sweet cream was pressurized with nitrous oxide to form sprayable whipped cream, as the first spraycan foam product.
