= Journal of Chromatography A =

- Discipline: Analytical chemistry
- Language: English
- Edited by: J.G. Dorsey, S. Fanali, P.R. Haddad, R.W. Giese, H.K. Lee, C.F. Poole, M.L. Riekkola, P.J. Schoenmakers, N. Tanaka

Publication details
- History: 1958-present
- Publisher: Elsevier
- Frequency: Weekly
- Impact factor: 4.1 (2022)

Standard abbreviations
- ISO 4: J. Chromatogr. A

Indexing
- CODEN: JCRAEY
- ISSN: 0021-9673 (print); 1873-3778 (web)
- LCCN: 94659073
- OCLC no.: 29336194

Links
- Journal homepage; Online access

The Journal of Chromatography A is a peer-reviewed scientific journal publishing research papers in analytical chemistry, with a focus on techniques and methods used for the separation and identification of mixtures. The major difference between Journal of Chromatography A and Journal of Chromatography B is the focus being on preparative chromatography instead of analytical chromatography. The split of the Journal of Chromatography into two journals occurred in late 1993, with volume 652 being the first for Journal of Chromatography A.

Indexed by ISI the journal received an impact factor of 4.169 as reported in the 2014 Journal Citation Reports by Thomson Reuters, ranking it 15th out of 79 journals in the category "Biochemical Research Methods" and ranking it sixth out of 74 journals in the category "Chemistry, analytical".

== See also ==
- Journal of Chromatography B
