= History of electrophoresis =

The first observation of electrokinetic phenomena occurred during first years of 19th century independently by Gautherot in 1801 and by Reuss in 1809.

The history of electrokinetics and electrophoresis for their most widely used scientific applications, such as molecular separation and chemical analysis, began with the work of Arne Tiselius in 1931, while new separation processes and chemical speciation analysis techniques based on electrophoresis and electrokinetics continue to be developed in the 21st century. Tiselius, with support from the Rockefeller Foundation, developed the moving-boundary electrophoresis, which was described in 1937 in his well-known and highly cited paper.

The method spread slowly until the advent of effective zone electrophoresis methods in the 1940s and 1950s, which used filter paper or gels as supporting media. By the 1960s, increasingly sophisticated gel electrophoresis methods made it possible to separate biological molecules based on minute physical and chemical differences, helping to drive the rise of molecular biology and biochemistry. Gel electrophoresis and related techniques became the basis for a wide range of biochemical methods, such as protein fingerprinting, Southern blot, other blotting procedures, DNA sequencing, and many more.

== Before Tiselius ==
Early work with the basic principle of electrophoresis dates to the early 19th century. The electrokinetic phenomenon was observed for the first time in 1807 by Russian professors Peter Ivanovich Strakhov and Ferdinand Frederic Reuß at Moscow University, who noticed that the application of a constant electric field caused clay particles dispersed in water to migrate.

Experiments by Johann Wilhelm Hittorf, Walther Nernst, and Friedrich Kohlrausch to measure the properties and behavior of small ions moving through aqueous solutions under the influence of an electric field led to general mathematical descriptions of the electrochemistry of aqueous solutions. Kohlrausch created equations for varying concentrations of charged particles moving through solution, including sharp moving boundaries of migrating particles. By the beginning of the 20th century, electrochemists had found that such moving boundaries of charged particles could be created with U-shaped glass tubes.

Methods of optical detection of moving boundaries in liquids had been developed by August Toepler in the 1860s; Toepler measured the schlieren (shadows) or slight variations in optical properties in inhomogeneous solutions. This method combined with the theoretical and experimental methods for creating and analysing charged moving boundaries would form the basis of Tiselius' moving-boundary electrophoresis method.

== Development and spread of the Tiselius apparatus ==
The apparatus designed by Arne Tiselius in 1931 enabled a range of new applications of electrophoresis in analyzing chemical mixtures. Its development, significantly funded by the Rockefeller Foundation, was an extension of Tiselius' earlier PhD studies. With more assistance from the Rockefeller Foundation, the expensive Tiselius apparatus was built at a number of major centers of chemical research.

== After Tiselius ==
By the late 1940s, new electrophoresis methods were beginning to address some of the shortcomings of the Tiselius' moving-boundary electrophoresis, which was not capable of completely separating electrophoretically similar compounds. Rather than charged molecules moving freely through solutions, the new methods used solid or gel matrices in new electrophoresis apparatuses to separate compounds into discrete and stable bands or zones. In 1950, Tiselius dubbed these methods zone electrophoresis.

Zone electrophoresis found widespread application in biochemistry after Oliver Smithies introduced starch gel as an electrophoretic substrate in 1955. Starch gel (and later polyacrylamide and other gels) enabled the efficient separation of proteins, making it possible with relatively simple technology to analyze complex protein mixtures and identify minute differences in related proteins.

Despite the development of high-resolution zone electrophoresis methods, the accurate control of parameters such as pore size and stability of polyacrylamide gels was still a major challenge in the 20th century. These technical problems were finally solved in the early 2000s with the introduction of a standardized polymerization time for optimized polyacrylamide gels. This enabled, for the first time, to fractionate physiological concentrations of highly purified metal ion cofactors and associated proteins in quantitative amounts for structure analysis.

=== Widespread application ===
Since the 1950s, electrophoresis methods have diversified considerably, and new methods and applications are still being developed as affinity electrophoresis, capillary electrophoresis, electroblotting, electrophoretic mobility shift assay, free-flow electrophoresis, isotachophoresis, preparative native PAGE, and pulsed-field gel electrophoresis.

== See also ==
- Electrophoresis
- Electrophoresis (journal)
- History of biochemistry
- History of chromatography
- History of electrochemistry
- History of gel electrophoresis
- History of molecular biology
