= SB buffer =

SB buffer is a buffer solution used in agarose and polyacrylamide gel electrophoresis for the separation of nucleic acids such as DNA and RNA. "SB" is a commercial trademark of Faster Better Media LLC for their sodium boric acid-based conductive medium (US Patent # 7811437), which is based on the publications of Brody and Kern.

It is made up of sodium borate, usually 1–10 mM at pH 8.0. It has a lower conductivity, produces sharper bands, and can be run at higher speeds than can gels made from TBE buffer or TAE buffer (5–35 V/cm as compared to 5–10 V/cm). At a given voltage, heat will be generated and thus the gel will be heated. However, SB buffer has lower conductivity than TBE and TAE, and thus the gel temperature is much lower than with TBE or TAE buffers. Therefore, the voltage can be increased to speed up electrophoresis so that a gel run takes only a fraction of the usual time. Downstream applications, such as isolation of DNA from a gel slice or southern blot analysis, work as expected with sodium borate gels.

LB buffer containing lithium borate is similar to sodium borate and has all of its advantages, but permits use of even higher voltages due to the lower conductivity of lithium ions as compared to sodium ions. However, lithium borate is somewhat more expensive.

== See also ==
- TBE buffer
- LB buffer
