= TE buffer =

Buffer solution used in molecular biology

TE buffer is a commonly used buffer solution in molecular biology, especially in procedures involving DNA, cDNA or RNA. "TE" is derived from its components: Tris, a common pH buffer, and EDTA, a molecule that chelates cations like Mg^{2+}. The purpose of TE buffer is to solubilize DNA or RNA, while protecting it from degradation.

== Recipe ==
A typical recipe for making 1X TE buffer is:

- 10 mM Tris, bring to pH 8.0 with HCl
- 1 mM EDTA, bring to pH 8.0 with NaOH

TE buffer is also known as T_{10}E_{1} buffer, which can be read as "T ten E one buffer". To make a 100 ml solution of T_{10}E_{1} buffer, 1 ml of 1 M Tris base (pH 10–11) and 0.2 ml EDTA (0.5 M) are mixed and made up with double distilled water up to 100ml. Add microliter amounts of high molarity HCl to lower the pH to 8.

Based on nuclease studies from the 1980s, the pH is usually adjusted to 7.5 for RNA and 8.0 for DNA. The respective DNA and RNA nucleases are supposed to be less active at these pH values, but pH 8.0 can safely be used for storage of both DNA and RNA.

EDTA further inactivates DNase, by binding to metal cations required by this enzyme.

Genomic and plasmid DNA can be stored in TE Buffer at 4 °C (39.2 °F) for short-term use, or -20 °C (-4 °F) to -80 °C (-112 °F) for long-term storage. Repeated freeze-thaw cycles should be avoided.

== Low TE or TE Low EDTA ==
The operation of the TE buffer is based on chelating metal cations such as Mg^{2+}. The problem is that the PCR polymerase also requires Mg^{2+} to function, so if the amount of EDTA is too high it can affect the PCR. There is a version of TE buffer with 10 times less amount of EDTA that is very frequently used for the forensic STR kits. Due to the use of kits with multiplex amplification, it is necessary to have a lower amount of EDTA in the sample so as not to interfere with the Mg^{2+} present in the reaction. If regular TE buffer is used to dilute the sample, an imbalance will be observed in the DNA profile, while Low TE will have a better balance. The Low TE buffer or TE Low EDTA buffer is composed of 10 mM Tris-HCl (pH 8.0) + 0.1 mM EDTA.

== See also ==
- LB buffer, lithium borate buffer, a similar buffer containing lithium ions in place of Tris
- TAE buffer and TBE buffer are often used in procedures involving nucleic acids, the most common being electrophoresis.
