= Isoelectric =

Isoelectric may refer to:

- Isoelectric point, the pH at which a particular molecule carries no net electrical charge
- Isoelectric focusing, a technique for separating different molecules by differences in their isoelectric point
- Isoelectric line representing the absence of electrical activity on an electrocardiogram

== See also ==
- Isoelectronicity, similarity of valence electrons and structure of different molecules
