= SYBR Green I =

Dye used for molecular genetics

Names
- IUPAC name N',N'-dimethyl-N-[4-[(Z)-(3-methyl-1,3-benzothiazol-2-ylidene)methyl]-1-phenylquinolin-1-ium-2-yl]-N-propylpropane-1,3-diamine

Identifiers
| CAS Number | 163795-75-3 |
| 3D model (JSmol) | Interactive image |
| Beilstein Reference | 9883000 |
| ChEMBL | ChEMBL1198924 |
| ChemSpider | 8611764 |
| PubChem CID | 10436340 |
| CompTox Dashboard (EPA) | DTXSID60936871 |
- InChI: InChI=1S/C32H37N4S/c1-5-20-35(22-13-21-33(2)3)31-23-25(24-32-34(4)29-18-11-12-19-30(29)37-32)27-16-9-10-17-28(27)36(31)26-14-7-6-8-15-26/h6-12,14-19,23-24H,5,13,20-22H2,1-4H3/q+1 Key: CGNLCCVKSWNSDG-UHFFFAOYSA-N
- SMILES: CCCN(CCCN(C)C)C1=CC(=Cc2sc3ccccc3[n+]2C)c2ccccc2N1c1ccccc1

Properties
| Chemical formula | C_{32}H_{37}N_{4}S^{+} |
| Molar mass | 509.73 g/mol |
| Solubility | Normally supplied solvated in dimethylsulfoxide |

Hazards
- GHS labelling
| Pictograms | (GHS08: Health hazard) |
| Signal word | Warning |
| Hazard statements | H341 |
| Precautionary statements | P203, P280, P318, P405, P501 |
- Except where otherwise noted, data are given for materials in their standard state (at 25 °C [77 °F], 100 kPa). verify (what is ?) Infobox references

SYBR Green I (SG) is an asymmetrical cyanine dye used as a nucleic acid stain in molecular biology. The SYBR family of dyes is produced by Molecular Probes Inc., now owned by Thermo Fisher Scientific. SYBR Green I binds to DNA. The resulting DNA-dye-complex best absorbs 497 nanometer blue light (λ_{max} = 497 nm) and emits green light (λ_{max} = 520 nm). The stain preferentially binds to double-stranded DNA, but will stain single-stranded (ss) DNA with lower performance. SYBR Green can also stain RNA with a lower performance than ssDNA.

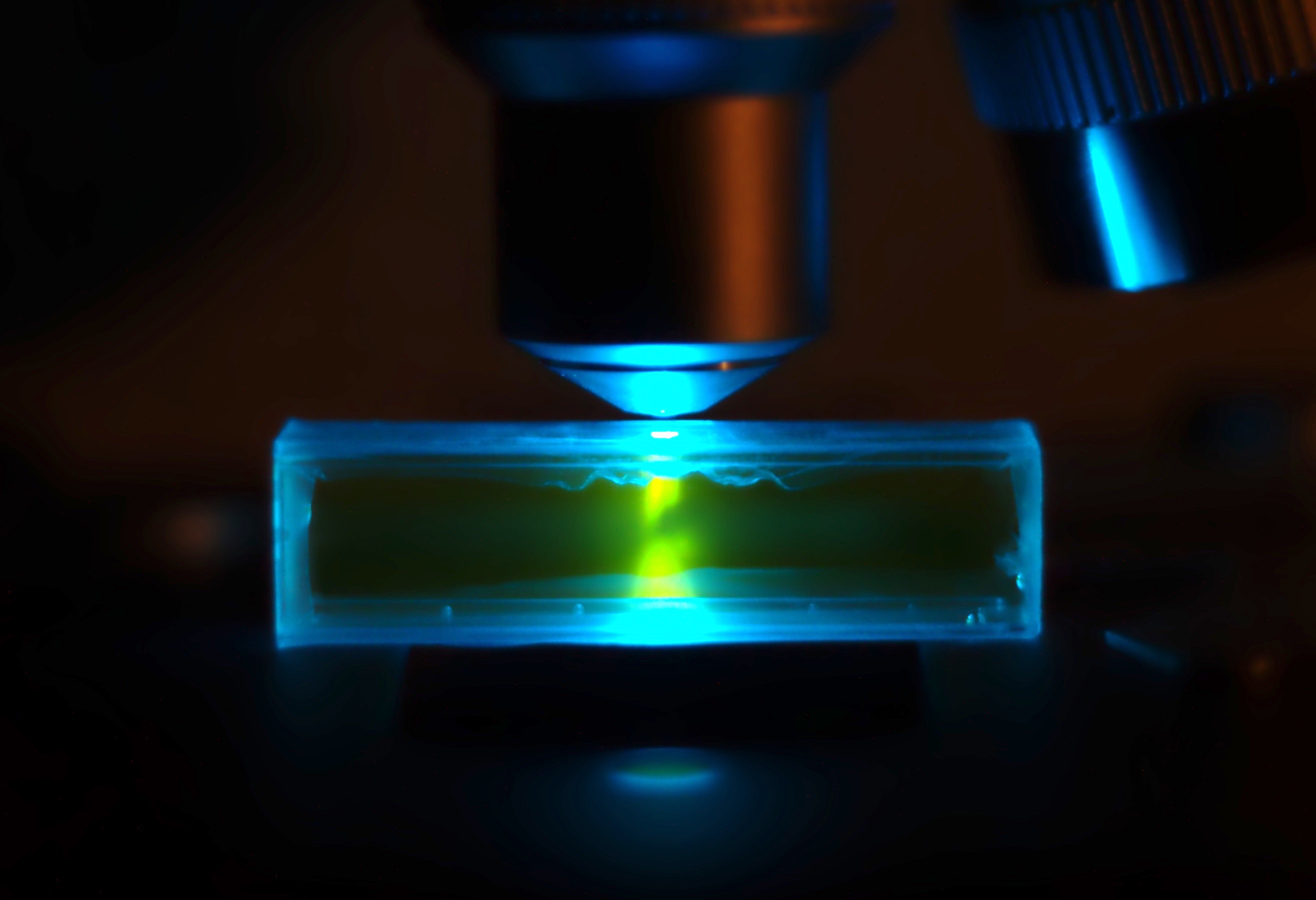
A sample of herring sperm stained with SYBR Green in a cuvette illuminated by blue light in an epifluorescence microscope. The SYBR green in the sample binds to the sperm DNA and, once bound, fluoresces giving off green light when illuminated by blue light

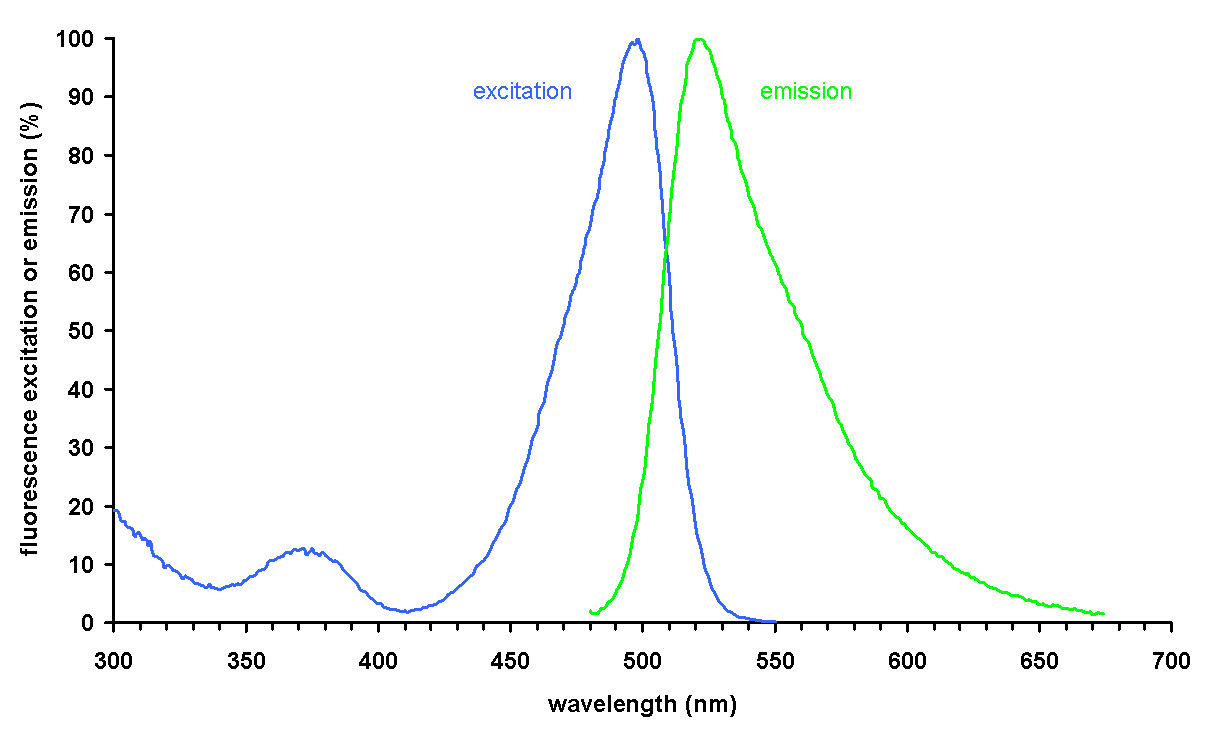
Spectrogram of SYBR Green I

== Uses ==
SYBR Green finds usage in several areas of biochemistry and molecular biology. It is used as a dye for the quantification of double stranded DNA in some methods of quantitative PCR. It is also used to visualise DNA in gel electrophoresis. Higher concentrations of SYBR Green can be used to stain agarose gels in order to visualise the DNA present. In addition to labelling pure nucleic acids, SYBR Green can also be used for labelling of DNA within cells for flow cytometry and fluorescence microscopy. In these cases RNase treatment may be required to reduce background from RNA in the cells.

A comprehensive study of Thiazole-Orange-Based DNA Dyes was published, involving SYBR Safe, SYBR Green, PicoGreen, SYTO-16, SYTO-9 and a new derivative TOPhBu. There, the syntheses of these compounds were published and they were characterised spectroscopically to quantify their fluorescence enhancement upon binding to double-stranded DNA. The ability of the dyes to detect DNA at low concentrations was evaluated using two new metrics, absolute fluorescence enhancement (AFE) and relative fluorescence enhancement (RFE). They were tested in qPCR experiments showing some important differences in the sensitivity and qPCR efficiency, which facilitate the DNA marker selection for analytical purposes. The study concluded that Sybr Green exhibits the highest fluorescence enhancement (AFE) and provides the best characteristic for PCR methods. The second best among ther studied dyes was TOPhBu with an analytical performance similar to Sybr Green.

== Safety ==
SYBR Green I is marketed as a replacement for ethidium bromide, a potential human mutagen, as both safer to work with and free from the complex waste disposal issues of ethidium bromide. However any small molecule capable of binding DNA with high affinity is a possible carcinogen, including SYBR Green.

In a study using the Ames test, which measures the ability of chemicals to cause mutations, when assayed at the same concentration SYBR Green I was on the order of 30 times less mutagenic than ethidium bromide.

== Similar cyanine dyes ==
- PicoGreen (PG)
- SYBR Safe
- SYBR Gold
- Thiazole orange (TO)
- Oxazole yellow (YO)
- Safe-Green
- Chai Green

== See also ==
- GelGreen
