= Gel extraction =

Removal of DNA fragments following gel electrophoresis

In molecular biology, gel extraction or gel isolation is a technique used to isolate a desired fragment of intact DNA from an agarose gel following agarose gel electrophoresis. After extraction, fragments of interest can be mixed, precipitated, and enzymatically ligated together in several simple steps. This process, usually performed on plasmids, is the basis for rudimentary genetic engineering.

After DNA samples are run on an agarose gel, extraction involves four basic steps: identifying the fragments of interest, isolating the corresponding bands, isolating the DNA from those bands, and removing the accompanying salts and stain.

To begin, UV light is shone on the gel in order to illuminate all the ethidium bromide-stained DNA. Care must be taken to avoid exposing the DNA to mutagenic radiation for longer than absolutely necessary. The desired band is identified and physically removed with a cover slip or razor blade. The removed slice of gel should contain the desired DNA inside. An alternative method, utilizing SYBR Safe DNA gel stain and blue-light illumination, avoids the DNA damage associated with ethidium bromide and UV light.

Several strategies for isolating and cleaning the DNA fragment of interest exist.

== Spin Column Extraction ==
Gel extraction kits are available from several major biotech manufacturers for a final cost of approximately 1–2 US$ per sample. Protocols included in these kits generally call for the dissolution of the gel-slice in 3 volumes of chaotropic agent at 50 °C, followed by application of the solution to a spin-column (the DNA remains in the column), a 70% ethanol wash (the DNA remains in the column, salt and impurities are washed out), and elution of the DNA in a small volume (30 μL) of water or buffer.

== Dialysis ==
The gel fragment is placed in a dialysis tube that is permeable to fluids but impermeable to molecules at the size of DNA, thus preventing the DNA from passing through the membrane when soaked in TE buffer. An electric field is established around the tubing (in a way similar to gel electrophoresis) long enough so that the DNA is removed from the gel but remains in the tube. The tube solution can then be pipetted out and will contain the desired DNA with minimal background.

== Traditional ==
The traditional method of gel extraction involves creating a folded pocket of Parafilm wax paper and placing the agarose fragment inside. The agarose is physically compressed with a finger into a corner of the pocket, partially liquifying the gel and its contents. The liquid droplets can then be directed out of the pocket onto an exterior piece of Parafilm, where they are pipetted into a small tube. A butanol extraction removes the ethidium bromide stain, followed by a phenol/chloroform extraction of the cleaned DNA fragment.

The disadvantage of gel isolation is that background can only be removed if it can be physically identified using the UV light. If two bands are very close together, it can be hard to separate them without some contamination. In order to clearly identify the band of interest, further restriction digests may be necessary. Restriction sites unique to unwanted bands of similar size can aid in breaking up these potential contaminants.
