= Immunoelectrophoresis =

Biochemical methods of separation and characterization of proteins

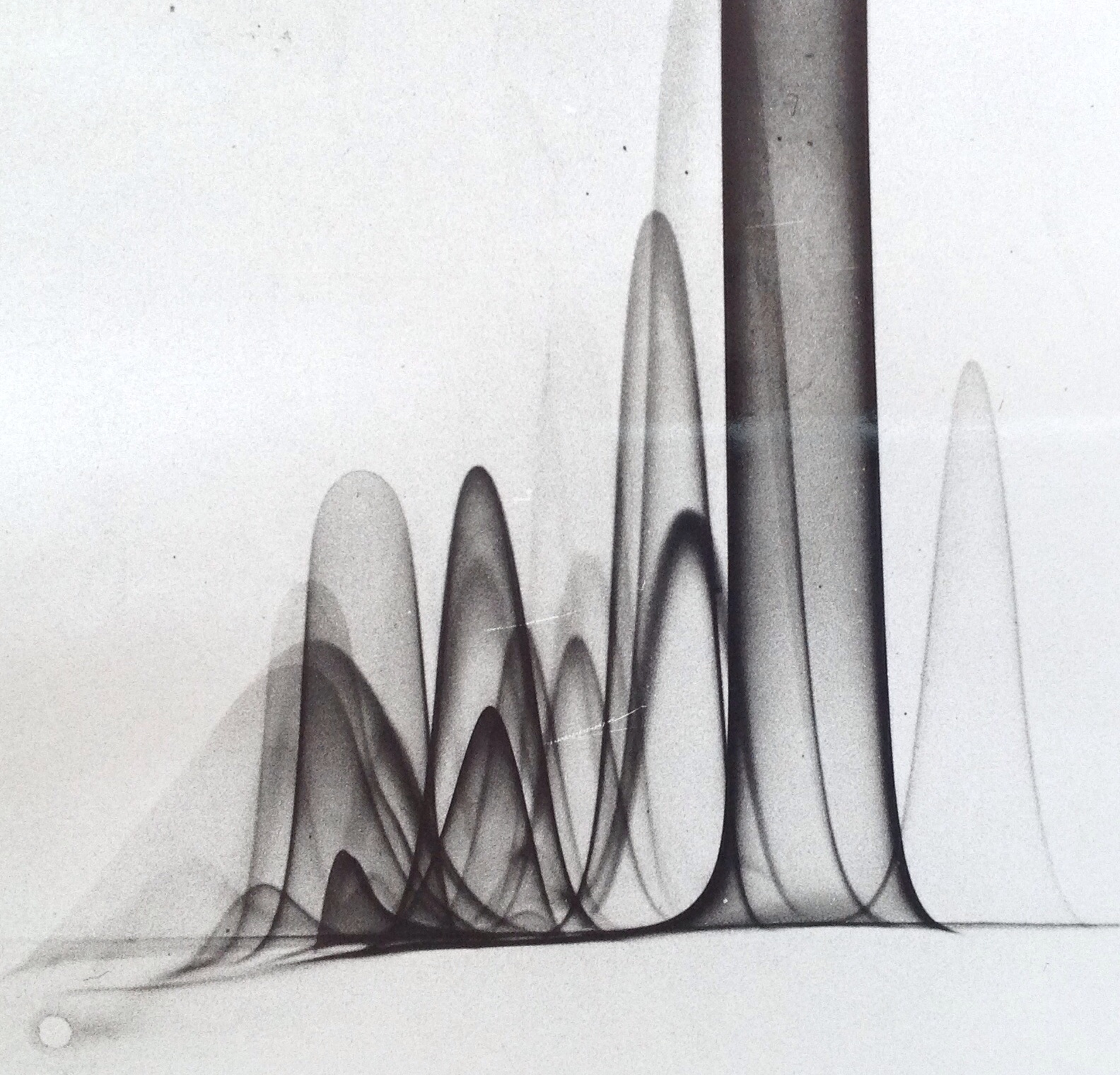
Crossed immunoelectrophoresis of 2 microlitres of normal human serum. The electrophoresis was performed in thin layers of agarose; the pictured gel is about 7x7 cm. The lower part is the first dimension gel without antibodies, where the serum was applied into the slot at the lower left. The upper part is the second dimension gel with Dako antibodies against human serum proteins. More than 50 major serum proteins can be named.

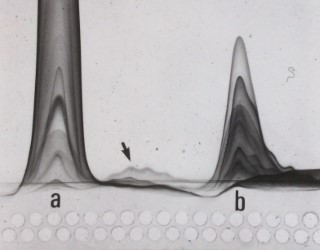
Fused rocket immunoelectrophoresis of an affinity chromatographic separation of human serum proteins on con A. A 15 microlitre sample from each fraction was applied (starting from left) and allowed to diffuse about one hour, then electrophoresis was performed overnight. Peak "a" was not retained, while peak "b" was retained and eluted with methyl-mannose. The arrow indicates some slightly retained proteins.

Immunoelectrophoresis is a general name for a number of biochemical methods for separation and characterization of proteins based on electrophoresis and reaction with antibodies. All variants of immunoelectrophoresis require immunoglobulins, also known as antibodies, reacting with the proteins to be separated or characterized. The methods were developed and used extensively during the second half of the 20th century. In somewhat chronological order: Immunoelectrophoretic analysis (one-dimensional immunoelectrophoresis ad modum Grabar), crossed immunoelectrophoresis (two-dimensional quantitative immunoelectrophoresis ad modum Clarke and Freeman or ad modum Laurell), rocket-immunoelectrophoresis (one-dimensional quantitative immunoelectrophoresis ad modum Laurell), fused rocket immunoelectrophoresis ad modum Svendsen and Harboe, affinity immunoelectrophoresis ad modum Bøg-Hansen.

== Methods ==
Immunoelectrophoresis is a general term describing many combinations of the principles of electrophoresis and reaction of antibodies, also known as immunodiffusion.

Agarose as 1% gel slabs of about 1 mm thickness buffered at high pH (around 8.6) is traditionally preferred for electrophoresis and the reaction with antibodies. The agarose was chosen as the gel matrix because it has large pores allowing free passage and separation of proteins but provides an anchor for the immunoprecipitates of protein and specific antibodies. The high pH was chosen because antibodies are practically immobile at high pH. Electrophoresis equipment with a horizontal cooling plate was normally recommended for the electrophoresis.

Immunoprecipitates are visible in the wet agarose gel, but are stained with protein stains like Coomassie brilliant blue in the dried gel. In contrast to SDS-gel electrophoresis, the electrophoresis in agarose allows native conditions, preserving the native structure and activities of the proteins under investigation, therefore immunoelectrophoresis allows characterization of enzyme activities and ligand binding etc. in addition to electrophoretic separation.

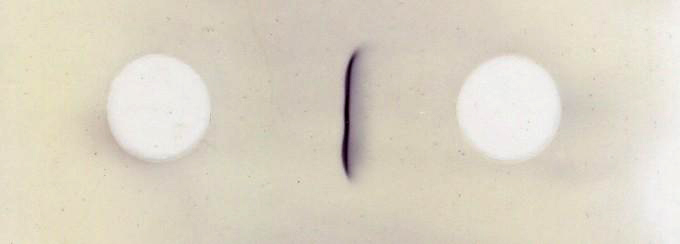
Plasmodium Glutamate dehydrogenase (pGluDH) separated by Counterimmunoelectrophoresis

Counterimmunoelectrophoresis is the combination of immunodiffusion with electrophoresis. In essence electrophoresis speeds up the process of moving the reactants together.

The immunoelectrophoretic analysis ad modum Grabar is the classical method of immunoelectrophoresis. Proteins are separated by electrophoresis, then antibodies are applied in a trough next to the separated proteins and immunoprecipitates are formed after a period of diffusion of the separated proteins and antibodies against each other. The introduction of the immunoelectrophoretic analysis gave a great boost to protein chemistry, some of the first results were the resolution of proteins in biological fluids and biological extracts. Among the important observations made were the great number of different proteins in serum, the existence of several immunoglobulin classes and their electrophoretic heterogeneity.

Crossed immunoelectrophoresis is also called two-dimensional quantitative immunoelectrophoresis ad modum Clarke and Freeman or ad modum Laurell. In this method the proteins are first separated during the first dimension electrophoresis, then instead of the diffusion towards the antibodies, the proteins are electrophoresed into an antibody-containing gel in the second dimension. Immunoprecipitation will take place during the second dimension electrophorsis and the immunoprecipitates have a characteristic bell-shape, each precipitate representing one antigen, the position of the precipitate being dependent on the amount of protein as well as the amount of specific antibody in the gel, so relative quantification can be performed. The sensitivity and resolving power of crossed immunoelectrophoresis is than that of the classical immunoelectrophoretic analysis and there are multiple variations of the technique useful for various purposes. Crossed immunoelectrophoresis has been used for studies of proteins in biological fluids, particularly human serum, and biological extracts.

Rocket immunoelectrophoresis is one-dimensional quantitative immunoelectrophoresis. The method has been used for quantitation of human serum proteins before automated methods became available.

Fused rocket immunoelectrophoresis is a modification of one-dimensional quantitative immunoelectrophorsis used for detailed measurement of proteins in fractions from protein separation experiments.

Affinity immunoelectrophoresis is based on changes in the electrophoretic pattern of proteins through specific interaction or complex formation with other macromolecules or ligands. Affinity immunoelectrophoresis has been used for estimation of binding constants, as for instance with lectins or for characterization of proteins with specific features like glycan content or ligand binding. Some variants of affinity immunoelectrophoresis are similar to affinity chromatography by use of immobilized ligands.

Binding of ligands. The open structure of the immunoprecipitate in the agarose gel will allow additional binding of radioactively labeled antibodies and other ligands to reveal specific proteins. Application of this possibility has been used for instance for identification of allergens through reaction with immunoglobulin E (IgE) and for identification of glycoproteins with lectins.

General comments. Two factors determine that immunoelectrophoretic methods are not widely used. First they are rather work intensive and require some manual expertise. Second they require rather large amounts of polyclonal antibodies. Today gel electrophoresis followed by electroblotting is the preferred method for protein characterization because its ease of operation, its high sensitivity, and its low requirement for specific antibodies. In addition proteins are separated by gel electrophoresis on the basis of their apparent molecular weight, which is not accomplished by immunoelectrophoresis, but nevertheless immunoelectrophoretic methods are still useful when non-reducing conditions are needed.

== Applications ==
Counter-immunoelectrophoresis and its modification

In comparison to other conventional methods of diagnosis e.g. for viral infection testing, counter-immunoelectrophoresis is a highly specific, simple, and speedy method that does not require sophisticated, expensive tools, input materials, or long-term capacity building. Considering the high informativeness of counter-immunoelectrophoresis, the results in practice can be dubious at times. As a result, by using a manufactured amphiphilic fluorescein-containing copolymer to increase the antigen and antibody interaction, counter-immunoelectrophoresis procedures can be improved. The use of the fluorescein copolymer-antigen mixture improved the association with plasma levels antibodies of animals immunized against hemorrhage illness and enhanced protein concentration in the precipitated zone, according to the findings. The capability of the amphiphilic fluorescein copolymer to boost antigen-antibody association and see the fluorescent accumulation domain may improve the efficiency of counter-immunoelectrophoresis for infectious disease rapid diagnosis.

Immunomethods

The terminologies, immune-methods and immune-chemical techniques refer to a variety of immunoelectrophoresis processes whose results are identified using antibodies and immunological methodologies. As a result, immunomethods' great sensitivity is a beneficial compared to the great expense of utilizing antibodies. Many different types of agarose electrophoresis are used to see how proteins travel under diverse circumstances. Proteins are recognized after the timer has expired by incubating gels with certain antibodies, which are then stained with Comassie blue.

Radial immunodiffusion

The radial immunodiffusion is an immunoassay technique for determining the concentration of a particular protein in a mixture including other modules. It is made up of an agarose gel, just like the others. Furthermore, in this procedure, the materials are placed into round wells in the gel's core part and disperse through it, generating a deposition ring with a diameter relation to the number of unbound protein that has diffused.

Identification of nanomaterial interaction with C3 protein complement and 2D immunoelectrophoresis

2D immunoelectrophoresis is a potential method that can be used for a range of functions involving protein flow of migrants, such as the deep examination of protein opsonization, in succession of first dimension as an activity of protein molar mass and the second dimension as a role of the isoelectric point. Despite the fact that it contains a large number of proteins, each spot on the 2D gel will symbolize a particular protein with a specific molecular mass and feature.

2D immunoelectrophoresis is also provided as a valuable implement for examining the stimulation of the signal transduction pathway, which is an essential factor in researching nanoparticles before in vivo delivery, because it will impact nanoparticle longevity, destination, and bio-distribution. This method employs two-dimensional horizontally agarose protein electrophoresis to specifically identify the association of nanoparticles with the C3 protein. Proteins can be separated in the first dimension according to their molecular mass (the shorter the protein, the far it drifts), and in the second dimension according to their abundance

Some limitations of immunoelectrophoresis

Though immunoelectrophoresis has a number of benefits, it also has certain drawbacks, such as when compared to other methods of electrophoresis, such as immunofixation, this method is sluggish and less precise. It can be difficult to interpret the results. Several tiny monoclonal proteins may be harder to identify. The accessibility of particular antibodies limits its utility in analytical techniques. Traditional (classical or conventional) immunoelectrophoresis has a number of drawbacks, including the fact that it is time consuming and the protocol might take up to 3 days to finish, has limited specificity and sensitivity, and the results can be difficult to read. As a result, newer immunoelectrophoresis techniques have largely supplanted the conventional immunoelectrophoresis.
