= SYBR Gold =

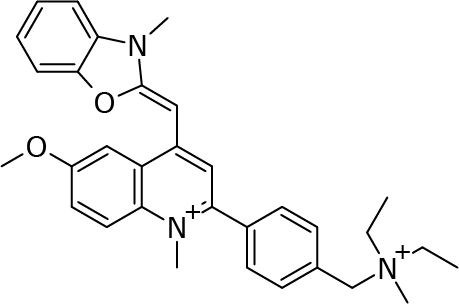

Names
- IUPAC name [2-(4-{[diethyl(methyl)ammonio]methyl}phenyl)-6-methoxy-1-methyl-4-{[(2Z)-3-methyl-1,3-benzoxazol-2-ylidene]methyl}quinolin-1-ium].

Identifiers
3D model (JSmol)	Interactive image
ChemSpider	129557996
PubChem CID	165360194
- InChI: InChI=1S/C32H37N3O2/c1-7-35(5,8-2)22-23-13-15-24(16-14-23)32-26(19-25-20-27(36-6)17-18-28(25)34(32)4)21-31-33(3)29-11-9-10-12-30(29)37-31/h9-21H,7-8,22H2,1-6H3/q+2 Key: JRDGFTBRETXRMI-UHFFFAOYSA-N
- SMILES: CC[N+](C)(CC)Cc1ccc(-c2c(C=C3Oc4ccccc4N3C)cc3cc(OC)ccc3[n+]2C)cc1

Properties
Chemical formula	C_{32}H_{37}N_{3}O_{2}^{2+}
Molar mass	495.663 g/mol
Solubility	Normally supplied solvated in dimethylsulfoxide (DMSO)
- Except where otherwise noted, data are given for materials in their standard state (at 25 °C [77 °F], 100 kPa). Infobox references

SYBR Gold is an asymmetrical cyanine dye. It can be used as a stain for double-stranded DNA, single-stranded DNA, and RNA. SYBR Gold is the most sensitive fluorescent stain of the SYBR family of dyes for the detection of nucleic acids. The SYBR family of dyes is produced by Molecular Probes Inc., now owned by Thermo Fisher Scientific

SYBR Gold is more sensitive than ethidium bromide, SYBR Green I, and SYBR Green II for detecting various types of nucleic acids. SYBR Gold's superior sensitivity is due to the high fluorescence quantum yield of the dye-nucleic acid complexes (~0.6-0.7) and the dye's large fluorescence enhancement upon binding to nucleic acids (~1000-fold). SYBR Gold can detect as little as 25 pg of DNA which makes it >10-fold more sensitive than ethidium bromide for detecting nucleic acids in denaturing urea, glyoxal, and formaldehyde gels, even with 300 nm transillumination.

== Fluorescence properties ==
SYBR Gold has two fluorescence excitation maxima when bound to DNA, one centered at ~300 nm and one at ~495 nm, and a single emission maximum at ~537 nm. SYBR Gold exhibits improved DNA cloning efficiency compared to others dyes of the SYBR family because it can be excited with blue light transillumination, which does not cause DNA damage. The fluorescence intensity increases linearly with the number of SYBR Gold molecules bound to DNA up to dye concentrations of ~ 2.5 μM, where quenching and inner filter effects become relevant. For dye concentrations ≤ 2.5 μM the fluorescence intensity as a function of the DNA concentration is well described by a global binding model for dye concentrations.

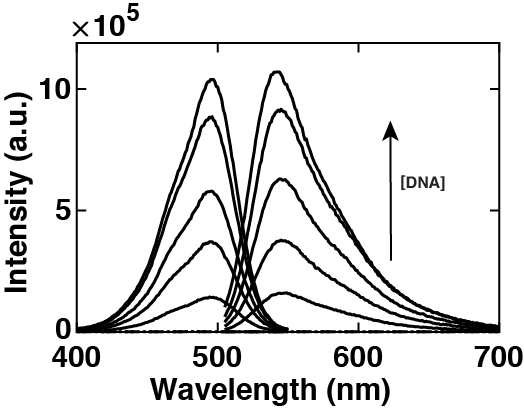
SYBR Gold excitation and emission spectra in the presence of increasing concentrations of double-stranded DNA

== Binding to DNA ==
SYBR Gold is an intercalator. This means it binds to DNA by insertion of one dye molecule between two planar bases / base pairs of DNA. Single molecule magnetic tweezers assays reveal systematic lengthening and unwinding of DNA by 19.1º ± 0.7º per dye molecule upon binding, consistent with intercalation. This is similar to related dyes like SYBR Green I. The dissociation constant – a measure to describe the binding affinity of SYBR Gold to double-stranded DNA – is 0.27 ± 0.03 μM.

== Uses ==
SYBR Gold is used in several areas of molecular biology and biochemistry. Its main use is to visualise DNA in electrophoresis, for example agarose or polyacrylamide gels. SYBR Gold is able to penetrate thick and high percentage agarose gels rapidly, and even formaldehyde agarose gels do not require de-staining, due to the low intrinsic fluorescence of the unbound dye. SYBR Gold can be readily removed from nucleic acids by ethanol precipitation, leaving pure templates available for subsequent manipulation or analysis.

Also, SYBR Gold can also be used for labelling of DNA within cells for flow cytometry and fluorescence microscopy.

To preserve fluorescence activity, SYBR Gold should be protected from light as much as possible, particularly once it has been diluted for use.

== Safety ==
The SYBR family of dyes is marketed as a replacement for ethidium bromide, a potential human mutagen, as both safer to work with and free from the complex waste disposal issues of ethidium. But no data are available addressing the mutagenicity or toxicity of SYBR Gold. Because SYBR Gold binds to DNA in an intercalative way with high affinity which makes it a possible carcinogen. Therefore, SYBR Gold should be handled with particular caution and solutions of SYBR Gold stain should be disposed of in accordance with local regulations

== Similar cyanine dyes ==
- SYBR Green I
- SYBR Green II
- Pico Green
- SYBR Safe
- SYTOX Orange
- Thiazole Orange
