= TBE =

TBE may refer to:

- TBE buffer, a buffer solution containing a mixture of Tris base, boric acid and EDTA
- The Butterfly Effect, a 2004 American psychological thriller film
- Teledyne Brown Engineering, a company owned by the American industrial conglomerate Teledyne Technologies
- Terabit Ethernet, projected future speeds of Ethernet above 100 Gbit/s
- Tetrabromoethane, a halogenated hydrocarbon
- Tick-borne encephalitis, a viral infectious disease involving the central nervous system
- Toronto Board of Education, the former secular school district serving the pre-merged city of Toronto
- The BlockChain Era
