= SYBR Safe =

DNA gel stain for molecular genetics

Names
- IUPAC name (Z)-4-((3-Methylbenzo[d]thiazol-2(3H)-ylidene)methyl)-1-propylquinolin-1-ium 4-methylbenzenesulfonate

Identifiers
| CAS Number | 1030826-36-8 |
| 3D model (JSmol) | Interactive image |
- InChI: InChI=1S/C21H21N2S.C7H8O3S/c1-3-13-23-14-12-16(17-8-4-5-9-18(17)23)15-21-22(2)19-10-6-7-11-20(19)24-21;1-6-2-4-7(5-3-6)11(8,9)10/h4-12,14-15H,3,13H2,1-2H3;2-5H,1H3,(H,8,9,10)/q+1;/p-1 Key: YTHKVAWQFBVEJQ-UHFFFAOYSA-M
- SMILES: CCC[n+]1ccc(C=C2Sc3ccccc3N2C)c2ccccc21.Cc1ccc(S(=O)(=O)[O-])cc1

Properties
| Chemical formula | C_{28}H_{28}N_{2}O_{3}S_{2} |
| Molar mass | 504.66 g·mol^{−1} |
| Solubility | Soluble in dimethylsulfoxide |
- Except where otherwise noted, data are given for materials in their standard state (at 25 °C [77 °F], 100 kPa). verify (what is ?) Infobox references

SYBR Safe is a cyanine dye used as a nucleic acid stain in molecular biology. SYBR Safe is one of a number of SYBR dyes made by the Life Technologies Corporation. SYBR Safe binds to DNA. The resulting DNA-dye-complex absorbs blue light (λ_{max} = 509 nm) and emits green light (λ_{max} = 524 nm).

== Safety ==
SYBR Safe is marketed as a safer alternative to ethidium bromide. SYBR Safe has a very similar structure to thiazole orange, which has a methyl group attached to the charged nitrogen, whereas SYBR Safe has an N-propyl group. Thiazole Orange has been shown to be three to four times less mutagenic than ethidium bromide whereas SYBR Safe is four to five times less mutagenic. Additionally, according to the Life Technologies website, SYBR Safe is not lethal in rats at doses as high as 5 g/kg, and rats don't show symptoms of acute toxicity. Thiazole orange does show toxicity at this dose.

== Similar cyanine dyes ==
- TO (Thiazole Orange)
- SYBR Green I
- SYBR Green II
- SYBR Gold
- YO (Oxazole Yellow)
- PG (PicoGreen)

== See also ==
- GelGreen - competing product with a different molecular structure and size
