= Lithium borate =

Lithium tetraborate
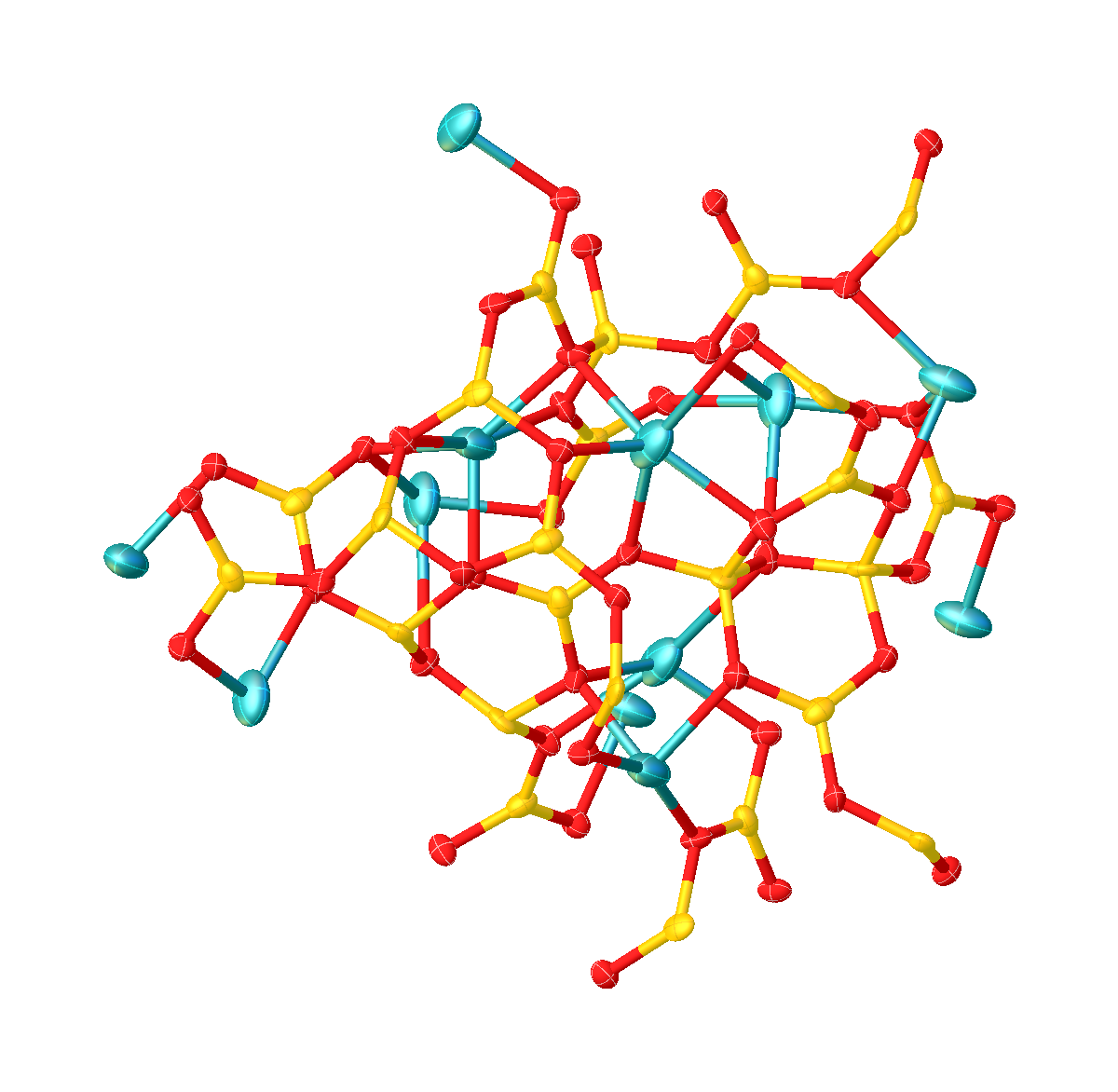

Names
- Other names Lithium borate

Identifiers
CAS Number	12007-60-2
3D model (JSmol)	Interactive image
ChemSpider	21169645
ECHA InfoCard	100.031.364
EC Number	234-514-3
PubChem CID	15764247
UNII	G5N01T5TYY
CompTox Dashboard (EPA)	DTXSID20893158
- InChI: InChI=1S/B4O7.2Li/c5-1-9-3(7)11-4(8)10-2-6;;/q-2;2*+1 Key: PSHMSSXLYVAENJ-UHFFFAOYSA-N; InChI=1/B4O7.2Li/c5-1-9-3(7)11-4(8)10-2-6;;/q-2;2*+1 Key: PSHMSSXLYVAENJ-UHFFFAOYAA
- SMILES: [Li+].[Li+].O=BOB([O-])OB([O-])OB=O

Properties
Chemical formula	Li_{2}B_{4}O_{7}
Molar mass	169.11 g/mol
Appearance	white powder
Density	2.4 g/cm^{3}, solid
Melting point	917 °C (1,683 °F; 1,190 K)
Solubility in water	moderately soluble

Hazards
NFPA 704 (fire diamond)	2 0 0
Safety data sheet (SDS)	External MSDS
- Except where otherwise noted, data are given for materials in their standard state (at 25 °C [77 °F], 100 kPa). verify (what is ?) Infobox references

Lithium borate, also known as lithium tetraborate, dilithium tetraborate or boron lithium oxide is an inorganic compound with the formula Li_{2}B_{4}O_{7}. A colorless solid, lithium borate is used in making glasses and ceramics. It is not to be confused with B_{8}Li_{2}O_{13}, also called lithium borate.

== Structure ==
Its structure consists of a polymeric borate backbone. The Li^{+} centers are bound to four and five oxygen ligands. Boron centers are trigonal and tetrahedral.

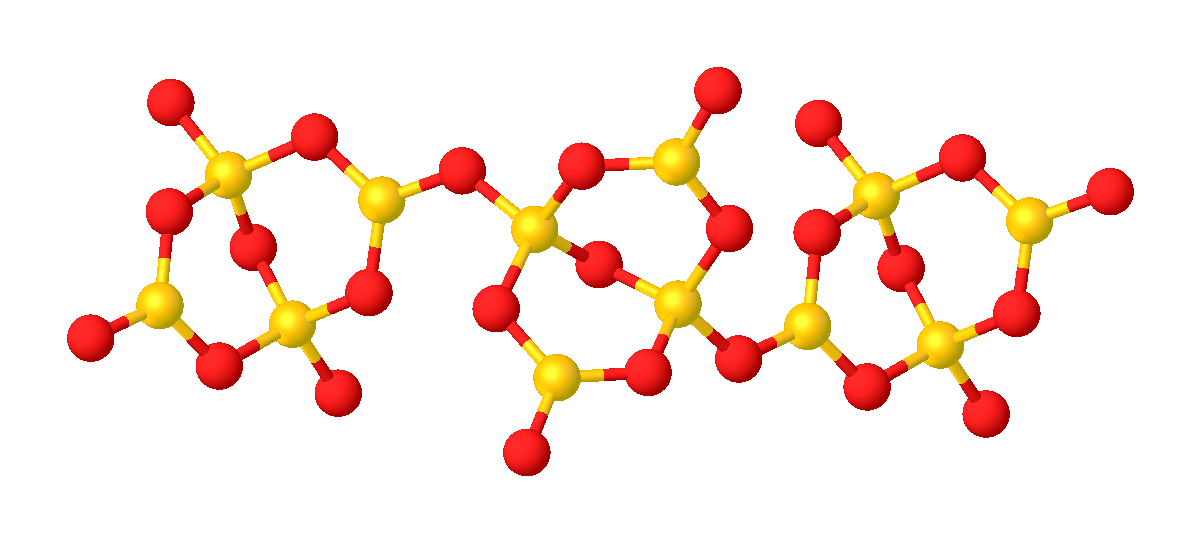
Borate backbone of Li_{2}B_{4}O_{7}.

Lithium borate can be used in the laboratory as LB buffer for gel electrophoresis of DNA and RNA. It is also used in the borax fusion method to vitrify mineral powder specimens for analysis by WDXRF spectroscopy.

== See also ==
- LB buffer
- Lithium metaborate (LiBO_{2})
