= Free-flow electrophoresis =

Free-flow electrophoresis (FFE), also known as carrier-free electrophoresis, is a matrix-free, high-voltage electrophoretic separation technique. FFE is an analogous technique to capillary electrophoresis, with a comparable resolution, that can be used for scientific questions, where semi-preparative and preparative amounts of samples are needed. It is used to quantitatively separate samples according to differences in charge or isoelectric point by forming a pH gradient. Because of the versatility of the technique, a wide range of protocols for the separation of samples like rare metal ions, protein isoforms, multiprotein complexes, peptides, organelles, cells, DNA origami, blood serum and nanoparticles exist. The advantage of FFE is the fast and gentle separation of samples dissolved in a liquid solvent without any need of a matrix, like polyacrylamide in gel electrophoresis. This ensures a very high recovery rate since analytes do not adhere to any carrier or matrix structure. Because of its continuous nature and high volume throughput, this technique allows a fast separation of preparative amounts of samples with a very high resolution. Furthermore, the separations can be conducted under native or denaturing conditions.

== History ==
FFE was developed in the 1960s by Kurt Hannig at the Max-Planck-Institute in Germany. Until the 1980s, it was a standardized technology for the separation of cells and organelles, and FFE was even tested in space to minimize the sedimentation under zero gravity. As flow cytometry became the standard method for cell sorting, FFE developments focused on the separation of proteins and charged particles. Some groups are also working on miniaturized versions of FFE systems or micro FFEs.

== Technique ==
The separation chamber consists of a backplate and a front plate. The backplate usually consists of a cooled aluminum block, covered with a plastic covered glass mirror. The front plate is nowadays made of PMMA, in earlier times glass has been used. The distance between the front- and the backplate can be adjusted by spacers and is usually between 0.1 and 0.5 mm. The front plate also contains the inlets for the separation buffers and the sample, the outlets for the fractionation tubes and the platinum wires as electrodes. By applying different buffers over the multiple buffer inlets the operator is able to change pH, salt concentrations or composition and therefore the separation conditions over the width of the chamber. The separation buffers and the sample are applied by peristaltic pumps, to ensure a laminar flow. A high voltage electric field is applied perpendicular to the laminar flow. Analytes in the laminar flow can be separated by charge density and isoelectric point. Because of its highly versatile nature, this technique can make use of different modes of electrophoresis, like for example isotachophoresis, isoelectric focusing or (interval) zone electrophoresis.

At the end of the separation cell, the separated sample is split up at the fractionation tubes and collected in microtiter plates.

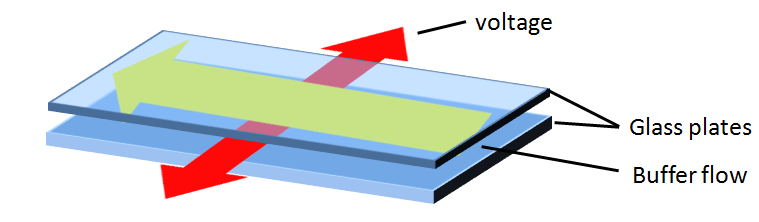
Schematic functionality of Free Flow Electrophoresis

Afterwards the samples can be characterized by all major techniques like HPLC, LC-MS, mass spectrometry (ESI / MALDI, depending on the protocol used) or electrophoresis (IEF / SDS PAGE, 2D-PAGE).

== Applications ==
Standard application include the high-resolution separation of protein complexes, membrane proteins, protein and antibody isoforms, cells, subcellular compartments (like organelles, ribosomes) and liposomes. By making use of very flat pH-gradients, generated by ampholytes, it is possible to separate protein isoforms, that vary by less than 0.02 pH units, with a throughput of around 3 mg/h. It is also possible to add additives to the buffers to increase the resolution or denature the samples. Typically concentrations of urea up to 8M, 0.1–1% of detergents like: CHAPS, CHAPSO, Digitonin, Dodecyl-ß-D-maltoside, Octyl-ß-D-glucoside, Triton-X-114 (IEF) and DTT up to 50 mM are tolerated.

== Key features ==
- Matrix free separation, ideal for conserving protein activity/protein complexes
- High resolution separation of protein complexes, membrane proteins, protein isoforms, cells, subcellular compartments (like organelles, ribosomes, etc.),
- Separation size range from ions to complete cells
- Sample recovery up to 99%, depending on sample and mode of operation
- High reproducibility of individual runs
- Separation in several minutes
- Protocols for Isoelectric Focusing separation with different commercial ampholytes and atoxic small molecular ProLytesTM for direct clinical application
- Fast and sensitive detection of separation quality via UV, IEF-gels
- Compatible with many other downstream techniques, e.g. HPLC, MS, SDS-, IEF- and 2D-GE
- Suited for separation of unstable proteins due to cooling of samples and separation chamber down to 4 °C
- Reduction of the complexity of the proteome before further proteomic analysis
- Enriching low-abundant proteins by removing excess of unwanted proteins
- Compatible with large and small sample volumes from around 50 μL up to several milliliters.
- Preparative as well as analytical operation modes
- Supports all electrophoretic separation modes (IEF, IZE, ZE, ITP)
- Can be run under native or denaturing conditions
