= Immobilized pH gradient =

General structure of Immobiline.

Within chemistry for acid–base reactions, Immobilized pH gradient (IPG) gels are the acrylamide gel matrix co-polymerized with the pH gradient, which result in completely stable gradients except the most alkaline (>12) pH values. The immobilized pH gradient is obtained by the continuous change in the ratio of Immobilines. An Immobiline is a weak acid or base defined by its pK value. Immobilized pH gradients (IPG) are made by mixing two kinds of acrylamide mixture, one with Immobiline having acidic buffering property and other with basic buffering property. The concentrations of the buffers in the two solutions define the range and shape of the pH gradient produced. Both solutions contain acrylamide monomers and catalysts. During polymerization, the acrylamide portion of the buffers co polymerize with the acrylamide and bisacrylamide monomers to form a polyacrylamide gel. These polymerised gels are backed with plastic based backing that allow ease in handling and improve IPG's performance. The gel is then washed to remove catalysts and unpolymerized monomers, which interfere with isoelectric separation. IPG increased reproducibility of isoelectric focusing and 2D-gel electrophoresis. Other advantages are increased resolution, reproducible separation of alkaline proteins and increased loading capacity (up to 10 mg).

This alternative method eliminates the problems of gradient instability and poor sample loading capacity associated with carrier ampholyte pH gradient. Commercial precast IPG gels are available.
