= Counterimmunoelectrophoresis =

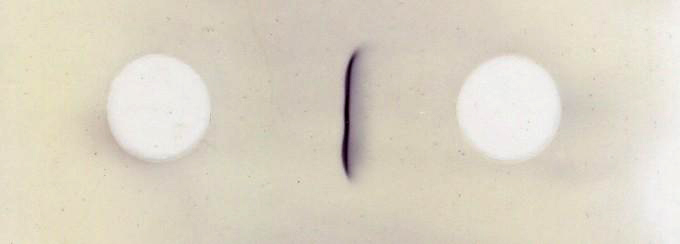
Plasmodium Glutamate dehydrogenase (pGluDH) separated by counterimmunoelectrophoresis

Counterimmunoelectrophoresis is a laboratory technique used to evaluate the binding of an antibody to its antigen, it is similar to immunodiffusion, but with the addition of an applied electrical field across the diffusion medium, usually an agar or polyacrylamide gel. The effect is rapid migration of the antibody and antigen out of their respective wells towards one another to form a line of precipitation, or a precipitin line, indicating binding.

== See also ==
- Electrophoresis
- Immunoelectrophoresis
