= GelGreen =

DNA gel stain for molecular genetics

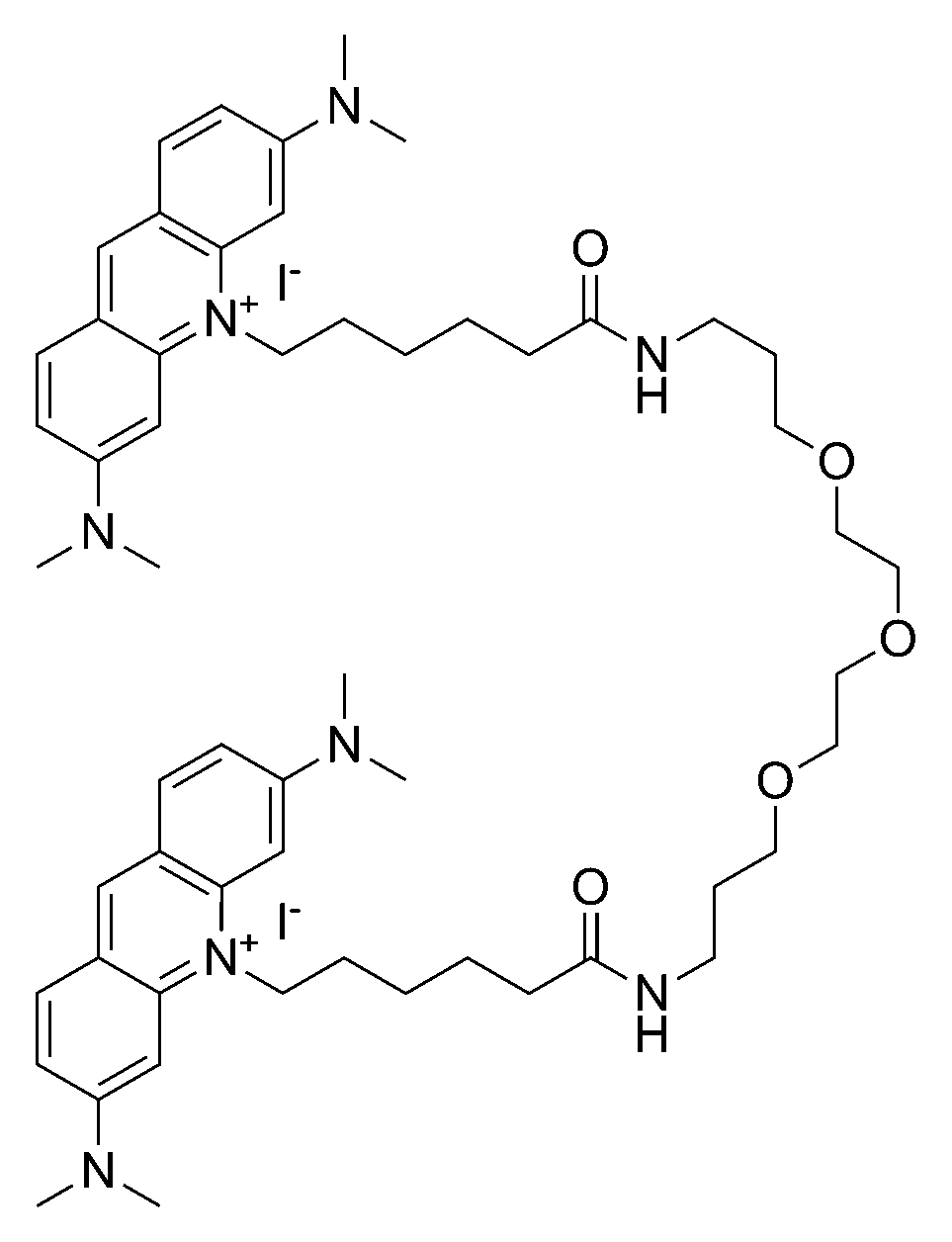

Names
- Preferred IUPAC name 10,10′-(6,22-Dioxo-11,14,17-trioxa-7,21-diazaheptacosane-1,27-diyl)bis[3,6-bis(dimethylamino)acridin-10-ium] diiodide
- Other names Dye No. 20, AOAO-13

Identifiers
3D model (JSmol)	Interactive image
ChemSpider	10032003
PubChem CID	11857532
CompTox Dashboard (EPA)	DTXSID501030500
- InChI: InChI=1S/C56H78N8O5.2HI/c1-59(2)47-23-19-43-37-44-20-24-48(60(3)4)40-52(44)63(51(43)39-47)29-13-9-11-17-55(65)57-27-15-31-67-33-35-69-36-34-68-32-16-28-58-56(66)18-12-10-14-30-64-53-41-49(61(5)6)25-21-45(53)38-46-22-26-50(62(7)8)42-54(46)64;;/h19-26,37-42H,9-18,27-36H2,1-8H3;2*1H Key: TWYVVGMYFLAQMU-UHFFFAOYSA-N; InChI=1/C56H78N8O5.2HI/c1-59(2)47-23-19-43-37-44-20-24-48(60(3)4)40-52(44)63(51(43)39-47)29-13-9-11-17-55(65)57-27-15-31-67-33-35-69-36-34-68-32-16-28-58-56(66)18-12-10-14-30-64-53-41-49(61(5)6)25-21-45(53)38-46-22-26-50(62(7)8)42-54(46)64;;/h19-26,37-42H,9-18,27-36H2,1-8H3;2*1H Key: TWYVVGMYFLAQMU-UHFFFAOYAG
- SMILES: O=C(NCCCOCCOCCOCCCNC(CCCCC[N+]1=C2C(C=CC(N(C)C)=C2)=CC3=C1C=C(N(C)C)C=C3)=O)CCCCC[N+]4=C5C(C=CC(N(C)C)=C5)=CC6=C4C=C(N(C)C)C=C6.[I-].[I-]

Properties
Chemical formula	C_{56}H_{80}I_{2}N_{8}O_{5}
Molar mass	1198.43 g/mol

Hazards
NFPA 704 (fire diamond)	0 0 0
Flash point	> 100 °C (212 °F; 373 K)
Safety data sheet (SDS)	10,000X in water, Biotium Inc.
- Except where otherwise noted, data are given for materials in their standard state (at 25 °C [77 °F], 100 kPa). Infobox references

GelGreen is an intercalating nucleic acid stain used in molecular genetics for agarose gel DNA electrophoresis. GelGreen consists of two acridine orange subunits that are bridged by a linear oxygenated spacer.

Its fluorophore, and therefore its optical properties, are essentially identical to those of other N-alkylacridinium orange dyes. When exposed to ultraviolet light, it will fluoresce with a greenish color that strongly intensifies after binding to DNA. The substance is marketed as a less toxic and more sensitive alternative to ethidium bromide. GelGreen is sold as a solution in either DMSO or water.

== See also ==
- Ethidium bromide
- GelRed
- SYBR Green I
- Agarose gel electrophoresis and gel electrophoresis of nucleic acids
- Acridine orange
