= Isoelectric focusing =

Type of electrophoresis

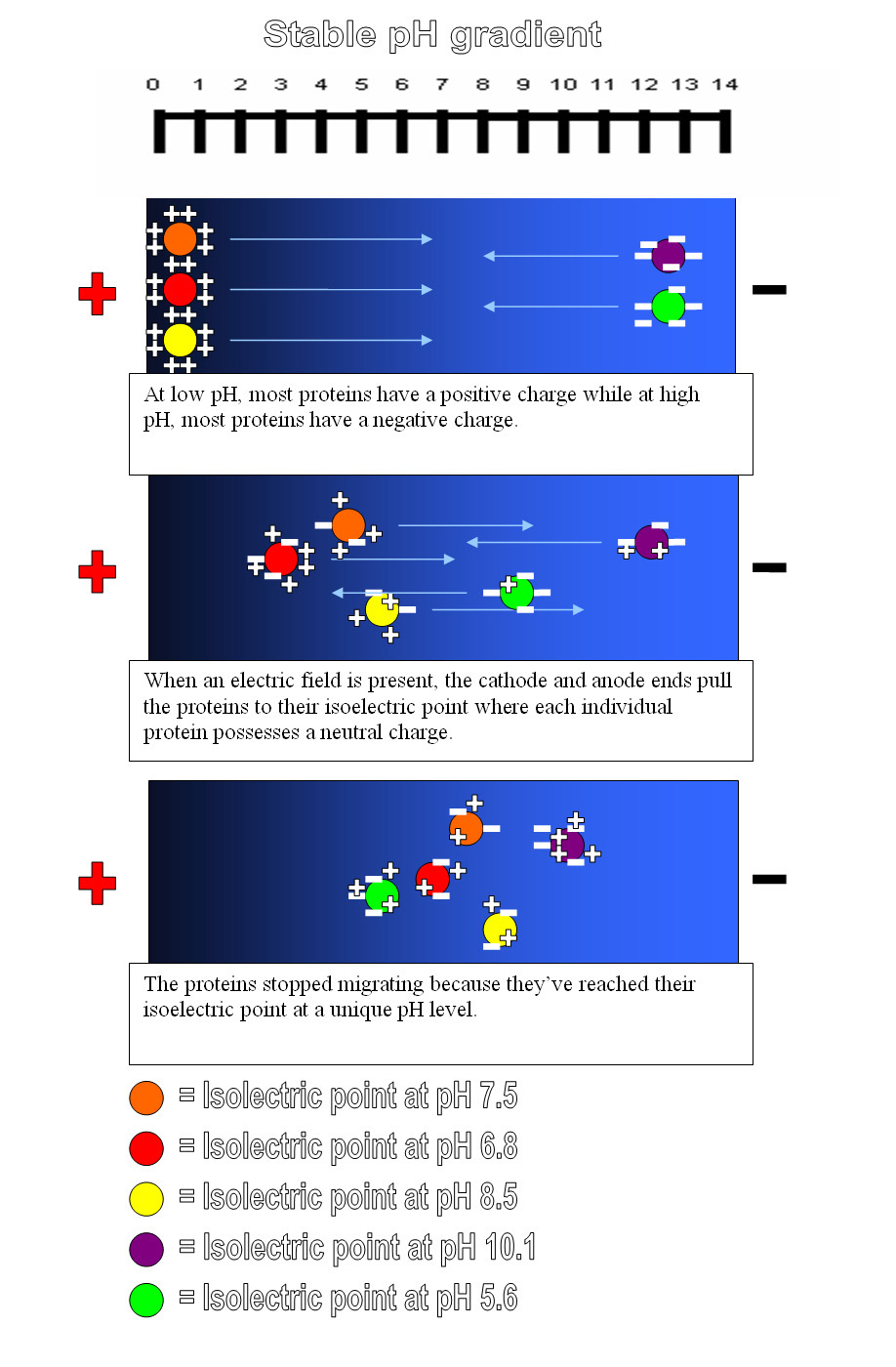
Scheme of isoelectric focusing with immobilized pH gradient (IPG) gels.

Isoelectric focusing (IEF), also known as electrofocusing, is a technique for separating different charged molecules by differences in their isoelectric point (pI). It is a type of zone electrophoresis usually performed on proteins in a gel that takes advantage of the fact that overall charge on the molecule of interest, i.e. the net charge density, is a function of the pH of its surroundings.

== Procedure ==
IEF involves adding an ampholyte solution into immobilized pH gradient (IPG) gels. IPGs are the acrylamide gel matrix co-polymerized with the pH gradient, which result in completely stable gradients except the most alkaline (>12) pH values. The immobilized pH gradient is obtained by the continuous change in the ratio of immobilines. An immobiline is a weak acid or base defined by its pK value.

A protein that is in a pH region below its isoelectric point (pI) will be positively charged and so will migrate toward the cathode (negatively charged electrode). As it migrates through a gradient of increasing pH, however, the protein's overall charge will decrease until the protein reaches the pH region that corresponds to its pI. At this point it has no net charge and so migration ceases (as there is no electrical attraction toward either electrode). As a result, the proteins become focused into sharp stationary bands with each protein positioned at a point in the pH gradient corresponding to its pI. The technique is capable of extremely high resolution with proteins differing by a single charge being fractionated into separate bands.

Molecules to be focused are distributed over a medium that has a pH gradient (usually created by aliphatic ampholytes). An electric current is passed through the medium, creating a "positive" anode and "negative" cathode end. Negatively charged molecules migrate through the pH gradient in the medium toward the "positive" end while positively charged molecules move toward the "negative" end. As a particle moves toward the pole opposite of its charge it moves through the changing pH gradient until it reaches a point in which the pH of that molecule's isoelectric point is reached. At this point the molecule no longer has a net electric charge (due to the protonation or deprotonation of the associated functional groups) and as such will not proceed any further within the gel. The gradient is established before adding the particles of interest by first subjecting a solution of small molecules such as polyampholytes with varying pI values to electrophoresis.

The method is applied particularly often in the study of proteins, which separate based on their relative content of acidic and basic residues, whose value is represented by the pI. Proteins are introduced into an immobilized pH gradient gel composed of polyacrylamide, starch, or agarose where a pH gradient has been established. Gels with large pores are usually used in this process to eliminate any "sieving" effects, or artifacts in the pI caused by differing migration rates for proteins of differing sizes. Isoelectric focusing can resolve proteins that differ in pI value by as little as 0.01. Isoelectric focusing is the first step in two-dimensional gel electrophoresis, in which proteins are first separated by their pI value and then further separated by molecular weight through SDS-PAGE. Isoelectric focusing, on the other hand, is the only step in preparative native PAGE at constant pH.

== Living cells ==
According to some opinions, living eukaryotic cells perform isoelectric focusing of proteins in their interior to overcome a limitation of the rate of metabolic reaction by diffusion of enzymes and their reactants, and to regulate the rate of particular biochemical processes. By concentrating the enzymes of particular metabolic pathways into distinct and small regions of its interior, the cell can increase the rate of particular biochemical pathways by several orders of magnitude. By modification of the isoelectric point (pI) of molecules of an enzyme by, e.g., phosphorylation or dephosphorylation, the cell can transfer molecules of the enzyme between different parts of its interior, to switch on or switch off particular biochemical processes.

== Microfluidic chip based ==
Microchip based electrophoresis is a promising alternative to capillary electrophoresis since it has the potential to provide rapid protein analysis, straightforward integration with other microfluidic unit operations, whole channel detection, nitrocellulose films, smaller sample sizes and lower fabrication costs.

== Multi-junction ==
The increased demand for faster and easy-to-use protein separation tools has accelerated the evolution of IEF towards in-solution separations. In this context, a multi-junction IEF system was developed to perform fast and gel-free IEF separations. The multi-junction IEF system utilizes a series of vessels with a capillary passing through each vessel. Part of the capillary in each vessel is replaced by a semipermeable membrane. The vessels contain buffer solutions with different pH values, so that a pH gradient is effectively established inside the capillary. The buffer solution in each vessel has an electrical contact with a voltage divider connected to a high-voltage power supply, which establishes an electrical field along the capillary. When a sample (a mixture of peptides or proteins) is injected in the capillary, the presence of the electrical field and the pH gradient separates these molecules according to their isoelectric points. The multi-junction IEF system has been used to separate tryptic peptide mixtures for two-dimensional proteomics and blood plasma proteins from Alzheimer's disease patients for biomarker discovery.
