= Affinity electrophoresis =

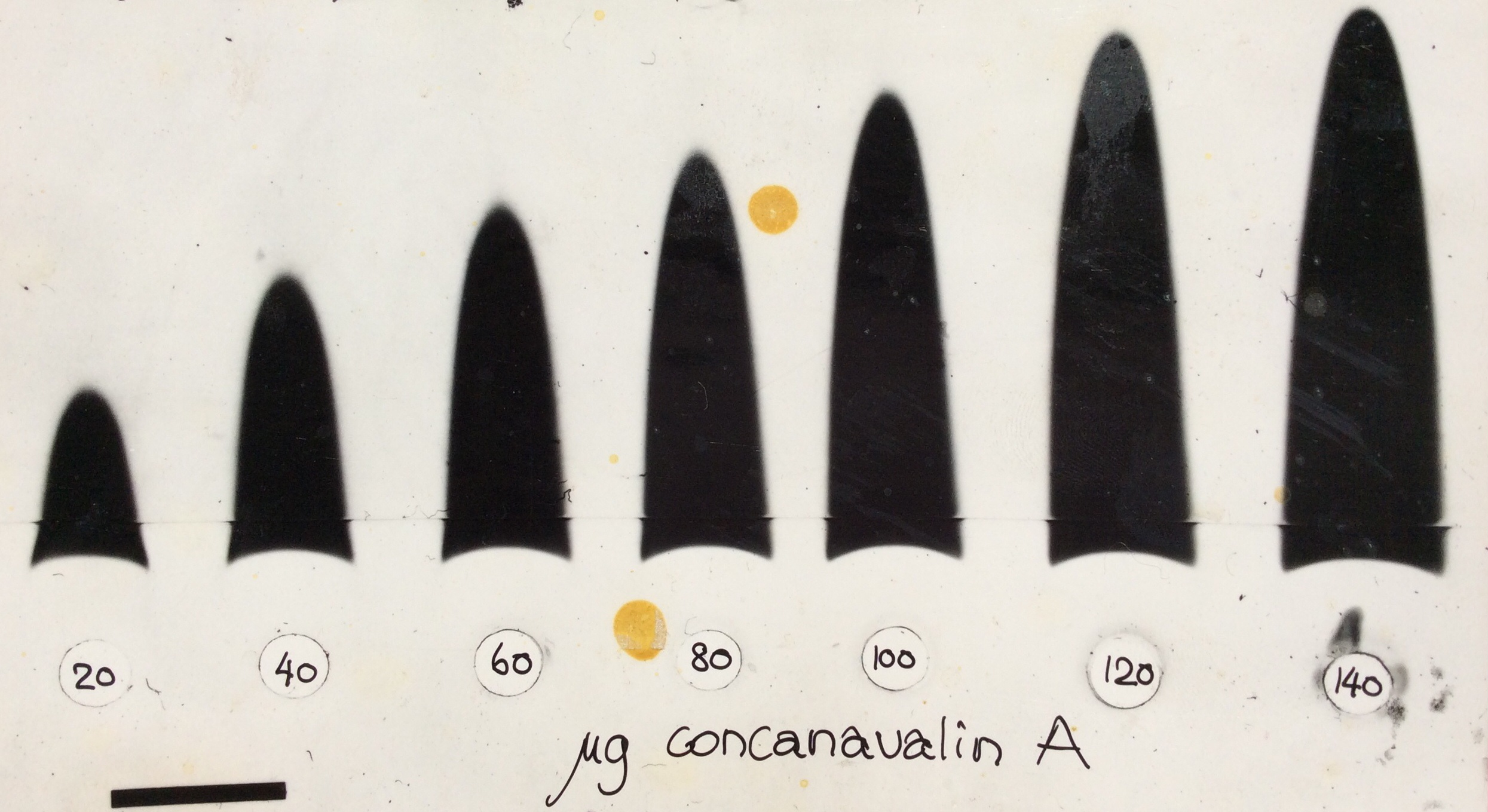
The quantitative principle of affinity electrophoresis illustrated with electrophoresis at pH 8.6 of concanavalin A into an agarose gel containing blood serum (3.6 microliter per square cm). The bar indicates 1 cm. Electrophoresis performed overnight at less than 10 V/cm. The analysis was performed early in the 1970s at the Protein Laboratory

Affinity electrophoresis is a general name for many analytical methods used in biochemistry and biotechnology. Both qualitative and quantitative information may be obtained through affinity electrophoresis. Cross electrophoresis, the first affinity electrophoresis method, was created by Nakamura et al. Enzyme-substrate complexes have been detected using cross electrophoresis. The methods include the so-called electrophoretic mobility shift assay, charge shift electrophoresis and affinity capillary electrophoresis. The methods are based on changes in the electrophoretic pattern of molecules (mainly macromolecules) through biospecific interaction or complex formation. The interaction or binding of a molecule, charged or uncharged, will normally change the electrophoretic properties of a molecule. Membrane proteins may be identified by a shift in mobility induced by a charged detergent. Nucleic acids or nucleic acid fragments may be characterized by their affinity to other molecules. The methods have been used for estimation of binding constants, as for instance in lectin affinity electrophoresis or characterization of molecules with specific features like glycan content or ligand binding. For enzymes and other ligand-binding proteins, one-dimensional electrophoresis similar to counter electrophoresis or to "rocket immunoelectrophoresis", affinity electrophoresis may be used as an alternative quantification of the protein. Some of the methods are similar to affinity chromatography by use of immobilized ligands.

== Types and methods ==
Currently, there is ongoing research in developing new ways of utilizing the knowledge already associated with affinity electrophoresis to improve its functionality and speed, as well as attempts to improve already established methods and tailor them towards performing specific tasks.

=== Agarose gel electrophoresis ===
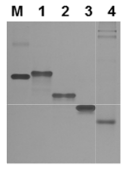
an example of an agarose gel after electrophoresis

A type of electrophoretic mobility shift assay (AMSA), agarose gel electrophoresis is used to separate protein-bound amino acid complexes from free amino acids. Using a low voltage (~10 V/cm) to minimize the risk for heat damage, electricity is run across an agarose gel. When dissolved in a hot buffered solution (50 to 55 degrees Celsius), it produces a viscous solution, but when cooled, it solidifies as a gel. Serum proteins, hemoglobin, nucleic acids, polymerase chain reaction products, etc. are all separated using this method. Agarose's fixed sulfate groups can cause enhanced electroendosmosis, which lowers band resolution. Utilizing ultrapure agarose gel with little sulfate content can stop this.

=== Rapid agarose gel electrophoresis ===
This technique utilizes a high voltage (≥ 20 V/cm) with a 0.5× Tris-borate buffer run across an agarose gel. This method differs from the traditional agarose gel electrophoresis by utilizing a higher voltage to facilitate a shorter run time as well as yield a higher band resolution. Other factors included in developing the technique of rapid agarose gel electrophoresis are gel thickness, and the percentage of agarose within the gel.

=== Boronate affinity electrophoresis ===
Boronate affinity electrophoresis utilizes boronic acid infused acrylamide gels to purify NAD-RNA. This purification allows for researchers to easily measure the kinetic activity of NAD-RNA decapping enzymes.

=== Affinity capillary electrophoresis ===
Affinity capillary electrophoresis (ACE) refers to a number of techniques which rely on specific and nonspecific binding interactions to facilitate separation and detection through a formulary approach in accordance with the theory of electromigration. Using the intermolecular interactions between molecules occurring in free solution or mobilized onto a solid support, ACE allows for the separation and quantitation of analyte concentrations and binding and dissociation constants between molecules. As affinity probes in CAE, fluorophore-labeled compounds with affinities for the target molecules are employed. With ACE, scientists hope to develop strong binding drug candidates, understand and measure enzymatic activity, and characterize the charges on proteins. Affinity capillary electrophoresis can be divided into three distinct techniques: non-equilibrium electrophoresis of equilibrated sample mixtures, dynamic equilibrium ACE, and affinity-based ACE.

Nonequilibrium electrophoresis of equilibrated sample mixtures is generally used in the separation and study of binding interactions of large proteins and involves combining both the analyte and its receptor molecule in a premixed sample.

These receptor molecules often take the form of affinity probes consisting of fluorophore-labeled molecules that will bind to target molecules that are mixed with the sample being tested. This mixture, and its subsequent complexes, are then separated through capillary electrophoresis. Because the original mixture of analyte and receptor molecule were bound together in an equilibrium, the slow dissociation of these two bound molecules during the electrophoretic experiment will result in their separation and a subsequent shift in equilibrium towards further dissociation. The characteristic smear pattern produced by the slow release of the analyte from the complex during the experiment can be used to calculate the dissociation constant of the complex.

Dynamic equilibrium ACE involves the combination of the analyte found in the sample and its receptor molecule found in the buffered solution in the capillary tube so that binding and separation only occur in the instrument. It is assumed for dynamic equilibrium affinity capillary electrophoresis that ligand-receptor binding occurs rapidly when the analyte and buffer are mixed. Binding constants are generally derived from this technique based upon the peak migration shift of the receptor which is dependent upon the concentration of the analyte in the sample.

Affinity-based capillary electrophoresis, also known as capillary electroaffinity chromatography (CEC), involves the binding of analyte in sample to an immobilized receptor molecule on the capillary wall, microbeads, or microchannels. CEC offers the highest separation efficacy of all three ACE techniques as non-matrixed sample components are washed away and the ligand then be released and analyzed.

Affinity capillary electrophoresis takes the advantages of capillary electrophoresis and applies them to the study of protein interactions. ACE is advantageous because it has a high separation efficiency, has a shorter analysis time, can be run at physiological pH, and involves low consumption of ligand/molecules. In addition, the composition of the protein of interest does not have to be known in order to run ACE studies. The main disadvantage, though, is that it does not give much stoichiometric information about the reaction being studied.

=== Affinity-trap polyacrylamide gel electrophoresis ===
Affinity-trap polyacrylamide gel electrophoresis (PAGE) has become one of the most popular methods of protein separation. This is not only due to its separation qualities, but also because it can be used in conjunction with a variety of other analytic methods, such as mass spectrometry, and western blotting. In addition to helping isolate and purify proteins from biological samples, AT-PAGE is anticipated to be helpful in analyses of variations in the expression of particular proteins as well as in investigations of posttranslational modifications of proteins. This method utilizes a two-step approach. First, a protein sample is run through a polyacrylamide gel using electrophoresis. Then, the sample is transferred to a different polyacrylamide gel (the affinity-trap gel) where affinity probes are immobilized. The proteins that do not have affinity for the affinity probes pass through the affinity-trap gel, and proteins with affinity for the probes will be "trapped" by the immobile affinity probes. These trapped proteins are then visualized and identified using mass spectrometry after in-gel digestion.

=== Phosphate affinity electrophoresis ===
Phosphate affinity electrophoresis utilizes an affinity probe which consists of a molecule that binds specifically to divalent phosphate ions in neutral aqueous solution, known as a "Phos-Tag". This methods also utilizes a separation gel made of an acrylamide-pendent Phos-Tag monomer that is copolymerized. Phosphorylated proteins migrate slowly in the gel compared to non-phosphorylated proteins. This technique gives the researcher the ability to observe the differences in the phosphorylation states of any given protein. This technique allows for the detection of distinct bands even in protein molecules that have the same amount of phosphorylated amino acid residues but are phosphorylated at different amino acid locations.

== See also ==
- Immunoelectrophoresis
