= TAE buffer =

Buffer solution

TAE buffer is a buffer solution containing a mixture of Tris base, acetic acid and EDTA.

In molecular biology, it is used in agarose electrophoresis typically for the separation of nucleic acids such as DNA and RNA. It is made up of Tris-acetate buffer, usually at pH 8.3, and EDTA, which sequesters divalent cations. TAE has a lower buffer capacity than TBE and can easily become exhausted, but linear, double stranded DNA runs faster in TAE.

According to studies by Brody and Kern, sodium boric acid (Note: 5 mM disodium borate decahydrate or 10 mM sodium hydroxide, pH adjusted to 8.5 with boric acid.) is a superior and cheaper conductive media for most DNA gel electrophoresis applications.

== Uses ==
TAE (Tris-acetate-EDTA) buffer is used as both a running buffer and in agarose gels. Its use in denaturing gradient gel electrophoresis methods for broad-range mutation analysis has also been described. TAE has been used at various concentrations to study the mobility of DNA in solution with and without sodium chloride. However, high concentrations of sodium chloride (and many other salts) in a DNA sample retard its mobility. This may lead to incorrect interpretations of the resulting DNA banding pattern.

== Preparation ==
TAE buffer is commonly prepared as a 50× stock solution for laboratory use. A 50× stock solution can be prepared by dissolving 242 g Tris base in water, adding 57.1 ml glacial acetic acid, and 100 ml of 500 mM EDTA (pH 8.0) solution, and bringing the final volume up to 1 litre. This stock solution can be diluted 49:1 with water to make a 1× working solution. This 1× solution will contain 40 mM Tris, 20 mM acetic acid, and 1 mM EDTA.

No.	Name	Per 1 mole	50x solution	50×	1× solution	1X
1	Tris base	121.1 g/L	2 M	242.2 g/L	40 mM	4.844 g/L
2	acetic acid	57.1 ml/L	1 M	57.1 ml/L	20 mM	1.21 ml/L
3	EDTA disodium salt dihydrate	372.24 g/L	50 mM	18.612 g/L	1 mM	0.372 g/L

2 M = 2000 mM so 2000 mM /50 = 40 mM for 1×.
1M = 1000 mM so 1000 mM /50 = 20 mM for 1×.
50 mM /50 = 1 mM for 1×.

First of all, these ingredients should be dissolved in 500 ml, then made up to 1000 ml.
Note: EDTA will take more time to dissolve, so while dissolving EDTA use magnetic stirrer (few amounts of EDTA in 3 or 4 times).

A step-by-step recipe of the preparation method for 50× TAE buffer is available on protocols.io.

== See also ==
- TBE buffer
- LB buffer
