= LB buffer =

Buffer solution in chemistry

LB buffer, also known as lithium borate buffer, is a buffer solution used in agarose electrophoresis, typically for the separation of nucleic acids such as DNA and RNA. It is made up of Lithium borate (lithium hydroxide monohydrate and boric acid).

LB(R) is a registered (USPTO) trademark of Faster Better Media LLC, which owns US patent 7,163,610 covering low-conductance lithium borate polynucleotide electrophoresis.

Lithium Borate buffer has a lower conductivity, produces crisper resolution, and can be run at higher speeds than can gels made from TBE or TAE (5-50 V/cm as compared to 5-10 V/cm). At a given voltage, the heat generation and thus the gel temperature is much lower than with TBE/TAE buffers, therefore the voltage can be increased to speed up electrophoresis so that a gel run takes only a fraction of the usual time. Downstream applications, such as isolation of DNA from a gel slice or Southern blot analysis, work as expected with lithium boric acid gels.

SB buffer containing sodium borate is similar to lithium borate and has nearly all of its advantages at a somewhat lower cost, but the lithium buffer permits use of even higher voltages due to the lower conductivity of lithium ions as compared to sodium ions and has a better resolution for fragments above 4kb.

== See also ==
- Borate
- Lithium
- SB buffer
- TBE buffer
