= Moving-boundary electrophoresis =

Moving-boundary electrophoresis (MBE also free-boundary electrophoresis) is a technique for separation of chemical compounds by electrophoresis in a free solution.

== History ==
Moving-boundary electrophoresis was developed by Arne Tiselius in 1930. Tiselius was awarded the 1948 Nobel Prize in chemistry for his work on the separation of colloids through electrophoresis, the motion of charged particles through a stationary liquid under the influence of an electric field.

== Apparatus ==
The moving-boundary electrophoresis apparatus includes a U-shaped cell filled with buffer solution and electrodes immersed at its ends. The sample applied could be any mixture of charged components such as a protein mixture. On applying voltage, the compounds will migrate to the anode or cathode depending on their charges. The change in the refractive index at the boundary of the separated compounds is detected using schlieren optics at both ends of the solution in the cell.

== See also ==
- Capillary electrophoresis
