= TBE buffer =

Concept in molecular biology

TBE or Tris/Borate/EDTA, is a buffer solution containing a mixture of Tris base, boric acid and EDTA.

In molecular biology, TBE and TAE buffers are often used in procedures involving nucleic acids, the most common being electrophoresis. Tris-acid solutions are effective buffers for slightly basic conditions, which keep DNA deprotonated and soluble in water. EDTA is a chelator of divalent cations, particularly of magnesium (Mg^{2+}). As these ions are necessary co-factors for many enzymes, including contaminant nucleases, the role of the EDTA is to protect the nucleic acids against enzymatic degradation. But since Mg^{2+} is also a co-factor for many useful DNA-modifying enzymes such as restriction enzymes and DNA polymerases, its concentration in TBE or TAE buffers is generally kept low (typically at around 1 mM).

According to studies by Brody and Kern, sodium boric acid (Note: 5 mM disodium borate decahydrate or 10 mM sodium hydroxide, pH adjusted to 8.5 with boric acid.) is a superior and cheaper conductive media for most DNA gel electrophoresis applications.

== Recipe (1 liter of 5X stock solution) ==
- 54 g of Tris base (CAS# 77-86-1, free base)
- 27.5 g of boric acid (CAS# 10043-35-3)
- 20 ml of 0.5 M EDTA (CAS# 60-00-4) (pH 8.0)

Adjust pH to 8.3 by HCl.

TBE can be diluted to 1X prior to use in electrophoresis, 0.5x is acceptable as well. Higher concentrations will result in poor results due to excessive heat generation.

== See also ==
- LB buffer, lithium borate buffer, a similar buffer containing lithium ions in place of Tris
- TAE buffer, a similar buffer containing acetic acid in place of boric acid
