= C4H10O2S2 =

The molecular formula C_{4}H_{10}O_{2}S_{2} (molar mass: 154.25 g/mol, exact mass: 154.0122 u) may refer to:

- Dithioerythritol (DTE)
- Dithiothreitol (DTT)
