= C2H6OS =

The molecular formula C_{2}H_{6}OS (molar mass: 78.13 g/mol, exact mass: 78.0139 u) may refer to:

- Dimethyl sulfoxide (DMSO)
- 2-Mercaptoethanol, or β-mercaptoethanol
