= C3H6OS =

The molecular formula C_{3}H_{6}OS (molar mass: 90.14 g/mol, exact mass: 90.0139 u) may refer to:

- S-Methyl thioacetate
- 1,3-Oxathiolane
- syn-Propanethial-S-oxide, or (Z)-propanethial S-oxide
