= AEP =

AEP may refer to:

== Companies and organizations ==
- Alpha Epsilon Pi, an international Jewish college fraternity
- American Electric Power, an electric utility company
- Associação dos Escoteiros de Portugal (Scout Association of Portugal), interreligious and coed Scouting organization
- Association of Educational Psychologists, British trade union
- Association of Electricity Producers, a trade association for the UK electricity market
- Association of Environmental Professionals, a non-profit organization
- Australian Equality Party

== Software ==
- .aep, Adobe After Effects project file extension
- Android Extension Pack, a superset of OpenGL ES 3.1 introduced by Google in 2014
- AppleTalk Echo Protocol, a protocol designed to test the reachability of network nodes

== Sports ==
- AEP Olympias BC, alternate name for Olympiada Patras BC, a Greek professional basketball club
- AEP Paphos FC, a Cypriot soccer club
- Asociacion Española de Pickleball (Spanish Pickleball Association), the national governing body of pickleball in Spain

== Other uses ==
- Aeroparque Jorge Newbery in Buenos Aires, Argentina (IATA airport code AEP)
- The Algebraic Eigenvalue Problem, a mathematical book by James H. Wilkinson, published in 1965
- Aminoethylpiperazine, an organic compound
- Annual exceedance probability, a measure of flooding probability
- Asparagine endopeptidase, an enzyme
- Asymptotic equipartition property, a mathematical property used extensively in information theory
- Attenuated Energy Projectile
- Auditory evoked potential

== See also ==
- AEP Building, Columbus, Ohio
- AEP v. Connecticut, a 2011 US Supreme Court case
- Arctic Environmental Protection Strategy (AEPS)
