= C8H11N3O3S =

The molecular formula C_{8}H_{11}N_{3}O_{3}S (molar mass: 229.26 g/mol, exact mass: 229.0521 u) may refer to:

- Apricitabine
- Lamivudine (3TC)
