= SDD-AGE =

Method for detecting large protein polymers

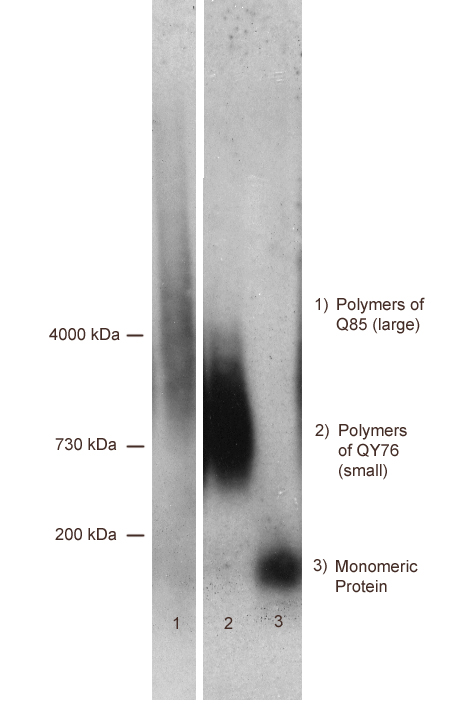

SDD-AGE (semi-denaturating detergent agarose gel electrophoresis) (Note: also referred to as SDS-AGE for sodium dodecyl sulfate-agarose gel electrophoresis) is a method for detecting and characterizing large protein polymers which are stable in 2% SDS at room temperature, unlike most large protein complexes. This method is very useful for studying prions and amyloids, which are characterized by the formation of proteinaceous polymers. Agarose is used for the gel since the SDS-resistant polymers are large (in the 200-4000+ kDa range) and cannot enter a conventional polyacrylamide gel, which has small pores. Agarose on the other hand has large pores, which allows for the separation of polymers.

Use of this method allowed researchers to understand that at least some types of prion aggregates existed in a two-level structure - protein molecules grouped into polymers, which are very stable and withstand treatment with 2% SDS at room temperature, and aggregates, which are bundles of polymers, that dissociate under these conditions.

Differences in the size of polymers can indicate the efficiency of polymer fragmentation in vivo.

== History ==
The method was created in the Molecular Genetics laboratory of the Russian Cardiology Research Institute and was published in 2003 by Kryndushkin et al. The original method used a TAE buffering system and incorporated a modified vacuum blotting system for the transfer of proteins onto a membrane (originally PVDF). The modified vacuum blotting system is actually a vacuum-assisted capillary transfer, since the vacuum only helps fluid that has already gone through the gel and membrane to leave the system.

== Variations ==
Other modifications have also been used, such as the one described in Bagriantsev et al., using traditional wet transfer and a TGB buffering system, and others using semi-dry transfer or capillary transfer.

DD-AGE, a further variation of the method that uses fully denaturing conditions - including reducing agents such as dithiothreitol (DTT) and heat denaturation at 95°C - is suitable for the analysis of heat-stable inclusion bodies of polyglutamine proteins.
