= Stains-all =

Dye

Names
- Preferred IUPAC name 1-Ethyl-2-[(1E,3Z)-3-(1-ethylnaphtho[1,2-d][1,3]thiazol-2(1H)-ylidene)-2-methylprop-1-en-1-yl]naphtho[1,2-d][1,3]thiazol-1-ium bromide
- Other names DBTC; Carbocyanin DBTC

Identifiers
CAS Number	7423-31-6
3D model (JSmol)	Interactive image
ChEBI	CHEBI:52273
ChemSpider	4588718
ECHA InfoCard	100.028.225
EC Number	231-047-7
PubChem CID	6364602
UNII	4MB06G6N2I
CompTox Dashboard (EPA)	DTXSID80884385
- InChI: InChI=1S/C30H27N2S2.BrH/c1-4-31-27(33-25-16-14-21-10-6-8-12-23(21)29(25)31)18-20(3)19-28-32(5-2)30-24-13-9-7-11-22(24)15-17-26(30)34-28;/h6-19H,4-5H2,1-3H3;1H/q+1;/p-1 Key: MPBRYMWMMKKRGC-UHFFFAOYSA-M
- SMILES: CCN1/C(=C/C(=C/C2=[N+](C3=C(S2)C=CC4=CC=CC=C43)CC)/C)/SC5=C1C6=CC=CC=C6C=C5.[Br-]

Properties
Chemical formula	C_{30}H_{27}BrN_{2}S_{2}
Molar mass	559.58 g·mol^{−1}

Hazards
- GHS labelling
Pictograms	(GHS07: Exclamation mark)
Signal word	Warning
Hazard statements	H315, H319, H335
Precautionary statements	P261, P264, P264+P265, P271, P280, P302+P352, P304+P340, P305+P351+P338, P319, P321, P332+P317, P337+P317, P362+P364, P403+P233, P405, P501
- Except where otherwise noted, data are given for materials in their standard state (at 25 °C [77 °F], 100 kPa). Infobox references

Stains-all is a carbocyanine dye, which stains anionic proteins, nucleic acids, anionic polysaccharides and other anionic molecules.

== Properties ==
Stains-all is metachromatic and changes its color dependent on its contact to other molecules. The detection limit for phosphoproteins is below 1 ng after one hour of staining, for anionic polysaccharides between 10 and 500 ng. Highly anionic proteins are stained blue, proteoglycans purple and anionic proteins pink. RNA is stained blueish-purple with a detection limit of 90 ng and DNA is stained blue with a detection limit of 3 ng.

Stains-all is light sensitive, therefore the staining is performed in the absence of light and photographed immediately. Staining of proteins can be improved by a subsequent silver stain. The analogue Ethyl-Stains-all has similar properties as stains-all, with differences in solubility and staining properties.

== Applications ==
Stains-all stains nucleic acids, anionic proteins, anionic polysaccharides such as alginate and pectinate, hyaluronic acid and dermatan sulfate, heparin, heparan sulfate and chondroitin sulfate. It is used in SDS-PAGE, agarose gel electrophoresis and histologic staining, e.g. staining of growth lines in bones.
