= Dithiobutylamine =

Names
- Preferred IUPAC name (S)-2-aminobutane-1,4-dithiol
- Other names DTBA

Identifiers
CAS Number	1363594-47-1(2S); 1363376-98-0 (hydrochloride)
3D model (JSmol)	Interactive image
ChemSpider	32696684
PubChem CID	89734616
- InChI: InChI=1S/C4H11NS2/c5-4(3-7)1-2-6/h4,6-7H,1-3,5H2/t4-/m0/s1 Key: VGLCUHJZKWYDPC-BYPYZUCNSA-N
- SMILES: SC[C@H](CCS)N

Properties
Chemical formula	C_{4}H_{11}NS_{2}
Molar mass	137.26 g/mol
Appearance	White solid
Odor	Nearly odorless
Solubility in water	Soluble
- Except where otherwise noted, data are given for materials in their standard state (at 25 °C [77 °F], 100 kPa). Infobox references

Dithiobutylamine (DTBA) is a reducing agent intended as an alternative for DTT in biochemical uses. It was designed to be easily synthesized in non-racemic form, to have a lower pKa (allowing more effective reduction at neutral pH), and to have a low disulfide E°′ reduction potential. It was rationally designed & reported in 2012. It is commercially available.

== See also ==
- Dithiothreitol (DTT)
- 2-Mercaptoethanol (BME)
- TCEP
