= LGMN =

Protein-coding gene in the species Homo sapiens

Identifiers
- Aliases: LGMN, AEP, LGMN1, PRSC1, legumain
- External IDs: OMIM: 602620; MGI: 1330838; GeneCards: LGMN
Available structures
PDB	Ortholog search: PDBe RCSB
PDB	List of PDB id codes 4N6N, 4N6O, 4FGU, 4AWB, 4AWA, 4AW9
Enzyme activity
EC #	BRENDA	ExPASy	KEGG	MetaCyc
3.4.22.34	↗	↗	↗	↗

Gene location (Human)
Chr.	Chromosome 14 (human)
Band	14q32.12	Start	92,703,807 bp
Band	14q32.12	End	92,748,679 bp

Gene location (Mouse)
Chr.	Chromosome 12 (mouse)
Band	12|12 E	Start	102,360,343 bp
Band	12|12 E	End	102,406,072 bp
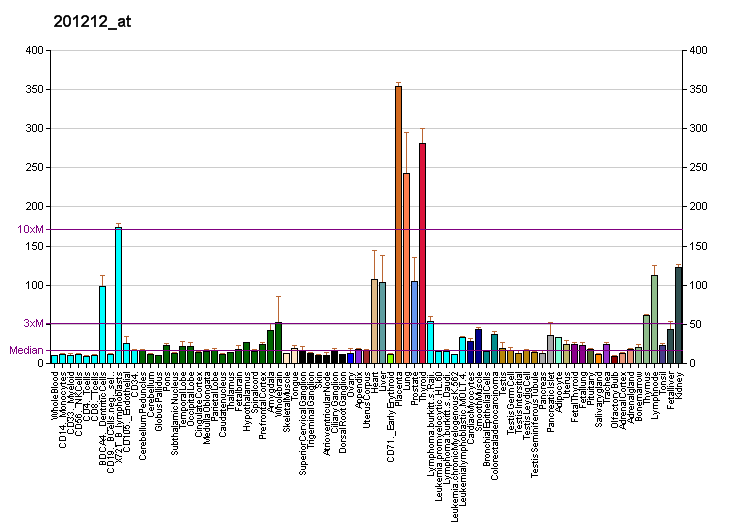
RNA expression pattern
Bgee	Human / Mouse (ortholog); Top expressed in: synovial joint; gallbladder; synovial membrane; right coronary artery; left lobe of thyroid gland; placenta; rectum; right lobe of thyroid gland; spleen; oocyte / Top expressed in: stroma of bone marrow; yolk sac; right kidney; human kidney; neural layer of retina; calvaria; decidua; saccule; proximal tubule; ankle joint; More reference expression data
BioGPS	More reference expression data
Gene ontology
Molecular function	cysteine-type peptidase activity; peptidase activity; hydrolase activity; cysteine-type endopeptidase activity; tau protein binding
Cellular component	late endosome; apical part of cell; lysosomal lumen; lysosome; extracellular exosome; endolysosome lumen; extracellular region; cytoplasm; perinuclear region of cytoplasm
Biological process	negative regulation of neuron apoptotic process; negative regulation of ERBB signaling pathway; renal system process; antigen processing and presentation of exogenous peptide antigen via MHC class II; vitamin D metabolic process; negative regulation of multicellular organism growth; vacuolar protein processing; receptor catabolic process; proteolysis; toll-like receptor signaling pathway; proteolysis involved in cellular protein catabolic process; response to acidic pH; memory; positive regulation of cell population proliferation; associative learning; negative regulation of gene expression; cellular response to hepatocyte growth factor stimulus; positive regulation of mitotic cell cycle; cellular response to calcium ion; positive regulation of monocyte chemotaxis; dendritic spine organization; activation of cysteine-type endopeptidase activity; self proteolysis; positive regulation of long-term synaptic potentiation; cellular response to amyloid-beta; positive regulation of endothelial cell chemotaxis
Sources:Amigo / QuickGO
Orthologs
Databases	NCBI: entry; OMA: entry
Species	Human	Mouse
Entrez	5641	19141
Ensembl	ENSG00000100600	ENSMUSG00000021190
UniProt	Q99538	O89017
RefSeq (mRNA)	NM_001008530; NM_005606; NM_001363696; NM_001363699	NM_011175; NM_001378875
RefSeq (protein)	NP_001008530; NP_005597; NP_001350625; NP_001350628	NP_035305; NP_001365804
Location (UCSC)	Chr 14: 92.7 – 92.75 Mb	Chr 12: 102.36 – 102.41 Mb
PubMed search
- Wikidata
View/Edit Human	View/Edit Mouse

Legumain is a protein that in humans is encoded by the LGMN gene.

This gene encodes a cysteine protease, legumain, that has a strict specificity for hydrolysis of asparaginyl bonds. This enzyme may be involved in the processing of bacterial peptides and endogenous proteins for MHC class II presentation in the lysosomal/endosomal systems. Enzyme activation is triggered by acidic pH and appears to be autocatalytic. Protein expression occurs after monocytes differentiate into dendritic cells. A fully mature, active enzyme is produced following lipopolysaccharide expression in mature dendritic cells. Overexpression of this gene may be associated with the majority of solid tumor types. This gene has a pseudogene on chromosome 13. Several alternatively spliced transcript variants have been described, but the biological validity of only two has been determined. These two variants encode the same isoform.
