= 1,3-Oxathiolane =

Names
- Preferred IUPAC name 1,3-Oxathiolane

Identifiers
CAS Number	2094-97-5
3D model (JSmol)	Interactive image
ChemSpider	58602
PubChem CID	65092
CompTox Dashboard (EPA)	DTXSID10175112
- InChI: InChI=1S/C3H6OS/c1-2-5-3-4-1/h1-3H2 Key: WJJSZTJGFCFNKI-UHFFFAOYSA-N
- SMILES: C1CSCO1

Properties
Chemical formula	C_{3}H_{6}OS
Molar mass	90.14 g·mol^{−1}
Appearance	colorless liquid
Density	1.1779 g/cm^{3}
Boiling point	127–129 °C (261–264 °F; 400–402 K)
- Except where otherwise noted, data are given for materials in their standard state (at 25 °C [77 °F], 100 kPa). Infobox references

1,3-Oxathiolane is an organosulfur compound with the formula (CH_{2})_{3}OS. It is a saturated five-membered heterocycle with non-adjacent S and O atoms. It is the parent of numerous derivatives. The parent compound is of little practical value, but there is some biotechnological interest in derivatives where one or more H atoms are replaced by other substituents.

== Preparation and occurrence ==
The compound is prepared by condensation of mercaptoethanol with formaldehyde, as typical for synthesis of thioacetals.

=== Derivatives ===
2-Methyl-4-propyl-1,3-oxathiane is a component of the flavor of passion fruit and other fruits.

Apricitabine, a drug candidate containing a 1,3-oxathiane, is a nucleoside reverse transcriptase inhibitor.

Chemical structure of apricitabine

== 1,2-Oxathiolane ==
1,2-Oxathiolane

In contrast to the well-developed area of 1,3-oxathiolanes, 1,2-oxathiolane and its derivatives are not prevalent in the literature. The parent compound, which is derived from 3-mercaptopropanol, has been detected in solution A bulky derivative has been characterized by X-ray crystallography.
