= TCEP =

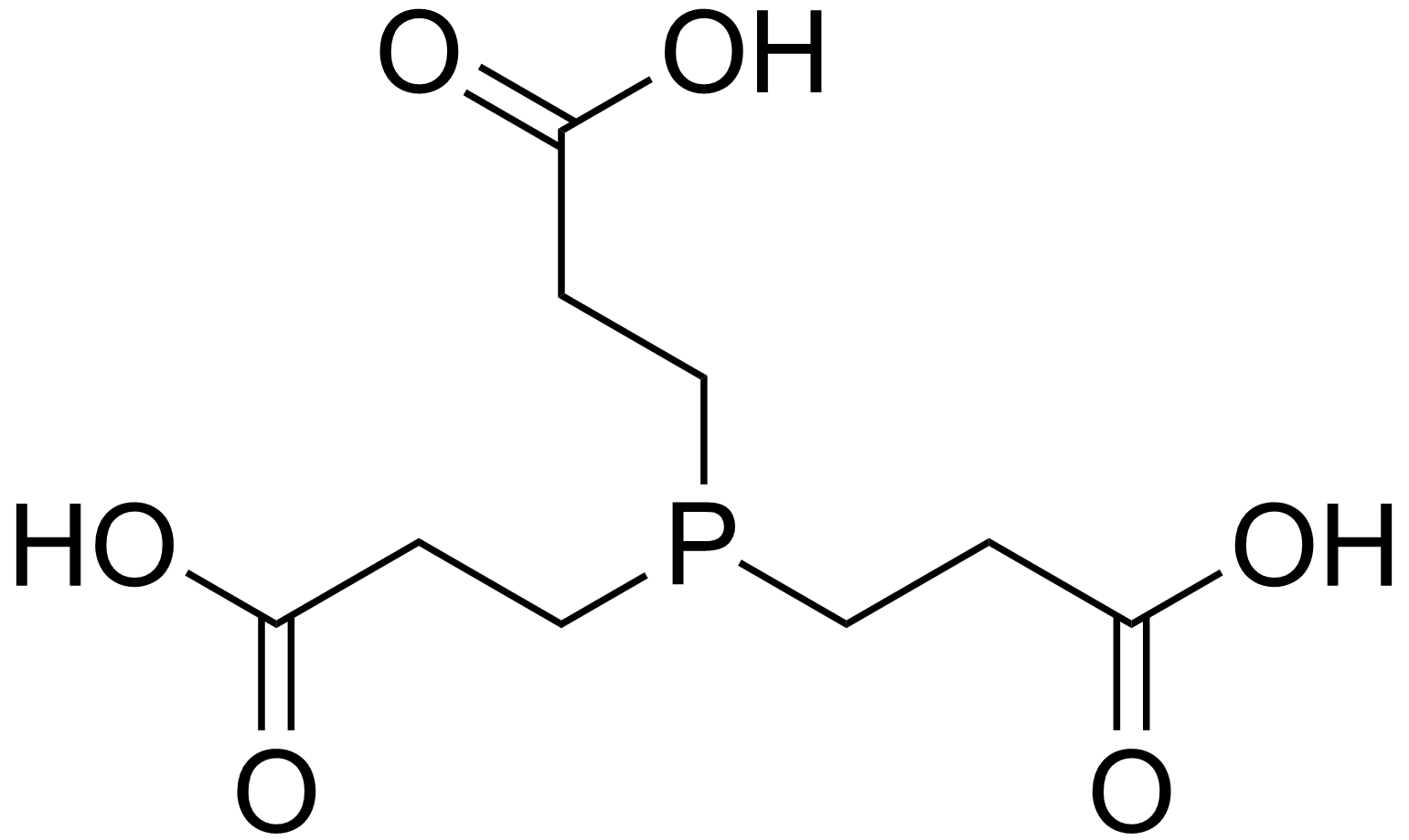

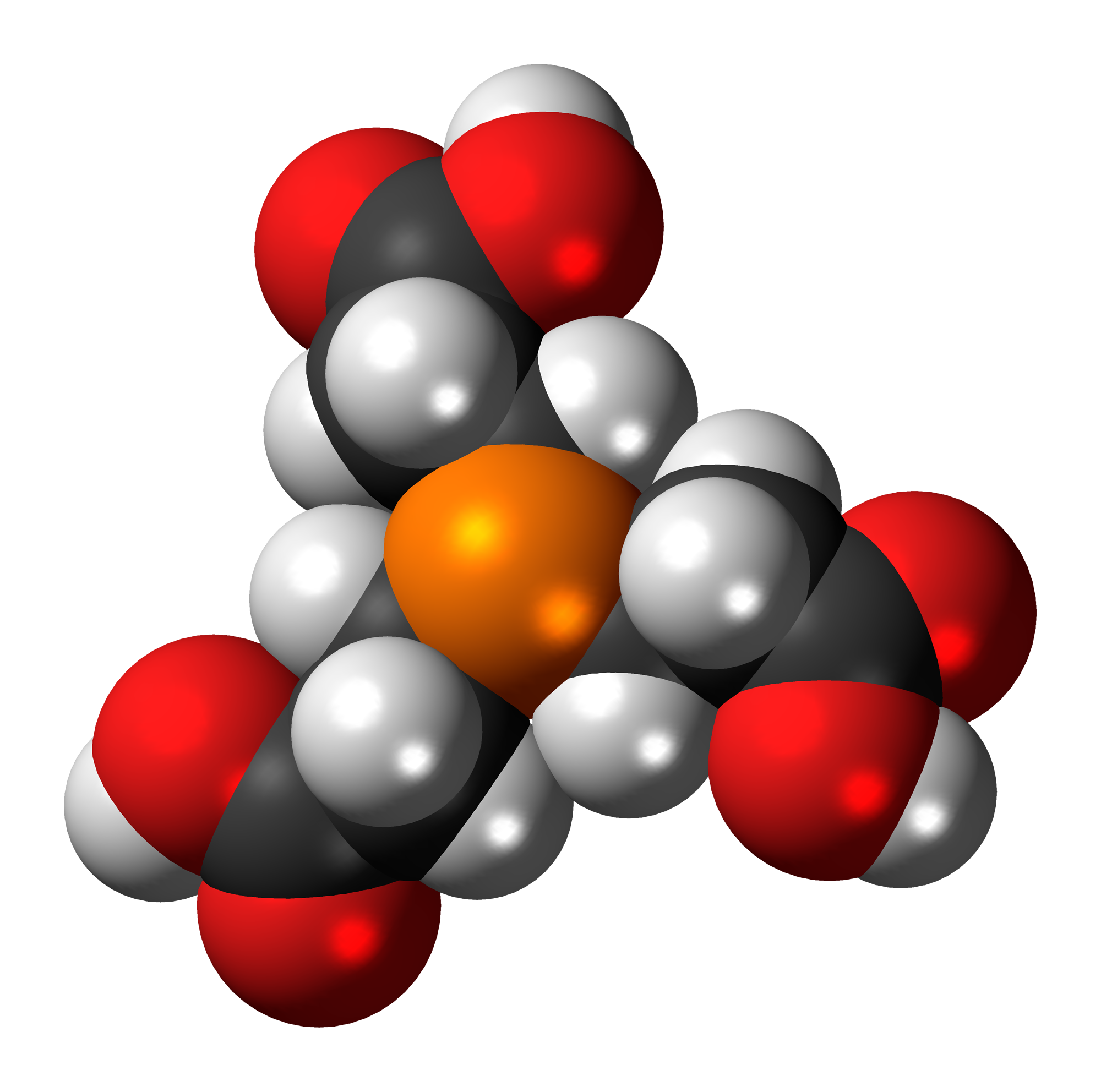

Names
- Preferred IUPAC name 3,3′,3′′-Phosphanetriyltripropanoic acid
- Other names TCEP; Tris(2-carboxyethyl)phosphine

Identifiers
CAS Number	51805-45-9 (hydrochloride salt)
3D model (JSmol)	Interactive image
ChemSpider	106653
PubChem CID	119411
UNII	H49AAM893K
CompTox Dashboard (EPA)	DTXSID90208290
- InChI: InChI=1S/C9H15O6P/c10-7(11)1-4-16(5-2-8(12)13)6-3-9(14)15/h1-6H2,(H,10,11)(H,12,13)(H,14,15) Key: PZBFGYYEXUXCOF-UHFFFAOYSA-N; InChI=1/C9H15O6P/c10-7(11)1-4-16(5-2-8(12)13)6-3-9(14)15/h1-6H2,(H,10,11)(H,12,13)(H,14,15) Key: PZBFGYYEXUXCOF-UHFFFAOYAQ
- SMILES: OC(CCP(CCC(O)=O)CCC(O)=O)=O

Properties
Chemical formula	C_{9}H_{15}O_{6}P
Molar mass	250.187 g·mol^{−1}
- Except where otherwise noted, data are given for materials in their standard state (at 25 °C [77 °F], 100 kPa). verify (what is ?) Infobox references

TCEP (tris(2-carboxyethyl)phosphine) is a reducing agent frequently used in biochemistry and molecular biology applications. It is often prepared and used as a hydrochloride salt (TCEP-HCl) with a molecular weight of 286.65 gram/mol. It is soluble in water and available as a stabilized solution at neutral pH and immobilized onto an agarose support to facilitate removal of the reducing agent.

== Synthesis ==
TCEP can be prepared by the acid hydrolysis of tris(cyanoethyl)phosphine.

== Applications ==
TCEP is often used as a reducing agent to break disulfide bonds within and between proteins as a preparatory step for gel electrophoresis.

Compared to the other two most common agents used for this purpose (dithiothreitol and β-mercaptoethanol), TCEP has the advantages of being odorless, a more powerful reducing agent, an irreversible reducing agent (in the sense that TCEP does not regenerate—the end product of TCEP-mediated disulfide cleavage is in fact two free thiols/cysteines), more hydrophilic, and more resistant to oxidation in air. It also does not reduce metals used in immobilized metal affinity chromatography.

TCEP is particularly useful when labeling cysteine residues with maleimides. TCEP can keep the cysteines from forming di-sulfide bonds and, unlike dithiothreitol and β-mercaptoethanol, it will not react as readily with the maleimide. However, TCEP has been reported to react with maleimide under certain conditions.

TCEP is also used in the tissue homogenization process for RNA isolation.

For Ultraviolet–visible spectroscopy applications, TCEP is useful when it is important to avoid interfering absorbance from 250 to 285 nanometers which can occur with dithiothreitol. Dithiothreitol will slowly over time absorb more and more light in this spectrum as various redox reactions occur.

== History ==
Reduction of biomolecules with trialkyphosphines received little attention for decades because historically available phosphines were extremely malodorous and/or insoluble in water. In 1969, TCEP was reported as an odorless and water-soluble trialkyphosphine suitable for biochemical use, however the potential use of TCEP for biochemical applications was almost totally ignored for decades. In 1991, Burns reported a new convenient synthetic procedure for TCEP, which set off TCEP becoming more widely available and marketed as a "new" reducing agent for biochemical use, & thus TCEP came into more widespread use throughout the 1990s.

== Reactions ==
TCEP will reduce disulfides to thiols in the presence of water:

Via a similar process it can also reduce sulfoxides and N-oxides. Some other side reactions have also been reported:

- Conversion of a cysteine residue into alanine in the presence of TCEP and heat (90˚C).
- Slow (but significant, 40% cleavage reported for two week storage at 4˚C) protein backbone cleavage at cysteine residues under mild conditions.

== Use in biological research ==
TCEP is available from various chemical suppliers as the hydrochloride salt. When dissolved in water, TCEP-HCl is acidic. A reported preparation is a 0.5 M TCEP-HCl aqueous stock solution that is pH adjusted to near-neutral pH and stored frozen at -20˚C. TCEP is reportedly less stable in phosphate buffers.

== See also ==
- 2-Mercaptoethanol (BME)
- Dithiothreitol (DTT)
- Dithiobutylamine (DTBA)
