= 2-Mercaptoethanol =

- Structural formula of 2-mercaptoethanol

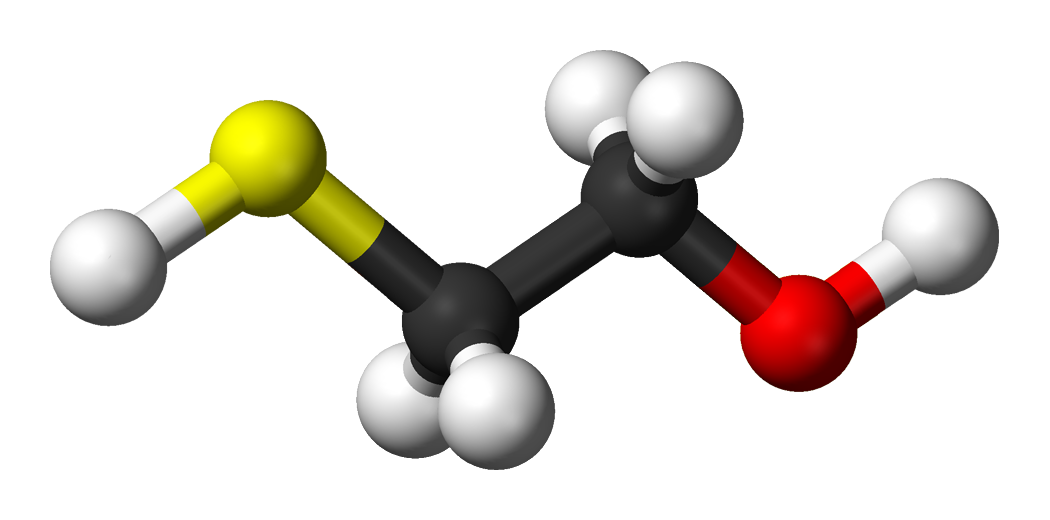
- Ball and stick model of 2-mercaptoethanol

Names
- Preferred IUPAC name 2-Sulfanylethan-1-ol
- Other names 2-Mercaptoethan-1-ol; 2-Hydroxy-1-ethanethiol β-Mercaptoethanol; Thioglycol; Beta-merc, BME, 2BME, 2-ME, β-met

Identifiers
CAS Number	60-24-2
3D model (JSmol)	Interactive image
Beilstein Reference	773648
ChEBI	CHEBI:41218
ChEMBL	ChEMBL254951
ChemSpider	1512
DrugBank	DB03345
ECHA InfoCard	100.000.422
EC Number	200-464-6
Gmelin Reference	1368
KEGG	C00928
MeSH	Mercaptoethanol
PubChem CID	1567
RTECS number	KL5600000
UNII	14R9K67URN
UN number	2966
CompTox Dashboard (EPA)	DTXSID4026343
- InChI: InChI=1S/C2H6OS/c3-1-2-4/h3-4H,1-2H2 Key: DGVVWUTYPXICAM-UHFFFAOYSA-N
- SMILES: OCCS

Properties
Chemical formula	C_{2}H_{6}OS
Molar mass	78.13 g·mol^{−1}
Appearance	Colorless liquid
Odor	Disagreeable, distinctive
Density	1.114 g/cm^{3}
Melting point	−100 °C (−148 °F; 173 K)
Boiling point	157 °C; 314 °F; 430 K
log P	−0.23
Vapor pressure	0.76 hPa (at 20 °C); 4.67 hPa (at 40 °C)
Acidity (pK_{a})	9.643
Basicity (pK_{b})	4.354
Refractive index (n_{D})	1.4996

Hazards
- GHS labelling
Pictograms	(GHS05: Corrosive) (GHS06: Toxic) (GHS09: Environmental hazard)
Signal word	Danger
Hazard statements	H301, H310, H315, H317, H318, H330, H410
Precautionary statements	P260, P273, P280, P284, P301+P310, P302+P350
Flash point	68 °C (154 °F; 341 K)
Explosive limits	18%
- Lethal dose or concentration (LD, LC)
LD_{50} (median dose)	244 mg/kg (oral, rat)

Related compounds
Related compounds	Ethylene glycol; 1,2-Ethanedithiol
- Except where otherwise noted, data are given for materials in their standard state (at 25 °C [77 °F], 100 kPa). verify (what is ?) Infobox references

2-Mercaptoethanol is the organosulfur compound with the formula HOCH_{2}CH_{2}SH. It is a colorless liquid. ME or βME, as it is commonly abbreviated, is used to reduce disulfide bonds. It is widely used because the hydroxyl group confers solubility in water and lowers the volatility. Due to its diminished vapor pressure its rotten egg odor is less objectionable than related thiols.

== Production ==
2-Mercaptoethanol is manufactured industrially by the reaction of ethylene oxide with hydrogen sulfide. Thiodiglycol and various zeolites catalyze the reaction.

== Reactions ==
2-Mercaptoethanol cleaves disulfide bonds.

2-Mercaptoethanol reacts with aldehydes and ketones to give the corresponding oxathiolanes. This makes 2-mercaptoethanol useful as a protecting group, giving a derivative whose stability is between that of a dioxolane and a dithiolane.

Like most alkylthiols, it adds to Michael acceptors such as acrylonitrile.

== Applications ==
=== Reducing proteins ===
Some proteins are denatured by 2-mercaptoethanol. In the case of excess 2-mercaptoethanol, the following equilibrium is shifted to the right:

RS–SR + 2 HOCH_{2}CH_{2}SH ⇌ 2 RSH + HOCH_{2}CH_{2}S–SCH_{2}CH_{2}OH

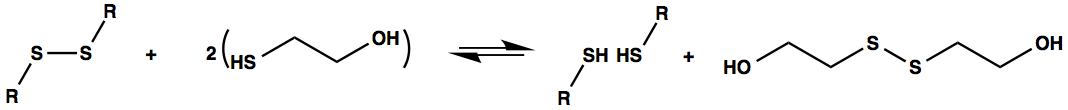

By breaking the S-S bonds, both the tertiary structure and the quaternary structure of some proteins can be disrupted. Because of its ability to disrupt the structure of proteins, it was used in the analysis of proteins, for instance, to ensure that a protein solution contains monomeric protein molecules, instead of disulfide linked dimers or higher order oligomers. However, since 2-mercaptoethanol forms adducts with free cysteines and is somewhat more toxic, dithiothreitol (DTT) is generally more used especially in SDS-PAGE. DTT is also a more powerful reducing agent with a redox potential (at pH 7) of −0.33 V, compared to −0.26 V for 2-mercaptoethanol.

2-Mercaptoethanol is often used interchangeably with dithiothreitol (DTT) or the odorless tris(2-carboxyethyl)phosphine (TCEP) in biological applications.

Although 2-mercaptoethanol has a higher volatility than DTT, it is more stable: 2-mercaptoethanol's half-life is more than 100 hours at pH 6.5 and 4 hours at pH 8.5; DTT's half-life is 40 hours at pH 6.5 and 1.5 hours at pH 8.5.

2-Mercaptoethanol and related reducing agents (e.g., DTT) are often included in enzymatic reactions to inhibit the oxidation of free sulfhydryl residues, and hence maintain protein activity. It is often used in enzyme assays as a standard buffer component.

=== Denaturing ribonucleases ===
2-Mercaptoethanol is used in some RNA isolation procedures to eliminate ribonuclease released during cell lysis. Numerous disulfide bonds make ribonucleases very stable enzymes, so 2-mercaptoethanol is used to reduce these disulfide bonds and irreversibly denature the proteins. This prevents them from digesting the RNA during its extraction procedure.

=== Deprotecting carbamates ===
Some carbamate protecting groups such as carboxybenzyl (Cbz) or allyloxycarbonyl (alloc) can be deprotected using 2-mercaptoethanol in the presence of potassium phosphate in dimethylacetamide.

=== Genetic transformation ===
DNA uptake in Escherichia coli can be facilitated by the addition of 2-mercaptoethanol in genetic transformation.

== Safety ==
2-Mercaptoethanol is moderately toxic and is an irritant to skin and eyes.

== See also ==
- Dithiothreitol (DTT)
- Dithiobutylamine (DTBA)
- TCEP
