= Apricitabine =

Chemical compound

Clinical data
- Routes of administration: Oral
- ATC code: none

Legal status
- Legal status: Investigational

Pharmacokinetic data
- Bioavailability: 65 to 80%
- Protein binding: < 4%
- Metabolism: To apricitabine triphosphate
- Elimination half-life: 6 to 7 hours (triphosphate)
- Excretion: Renal

Identifiers
- IUPAC name: 4-amino-1-[(2R,4R)-2-(hydroxymethyl)-1,3- oxathiolan-4-yl]pyrimidin-2(1H)-one
- CAS Number: 160707-69-7
- PubChem CID: 455041
- ChemSpider: 400685
- UNII: K1YX059ML1
- ChEMBL: ChEMBL210651
- CompTox Dashboard (EPA): DTXSID60166974

Chemical and physical data
- Formula: C_{8}H_{11}N_{3}O_{3}S
- Molar mass: 229.25 g·mol^{−1}
- 3D model (JSmol): Interactive image
- SMILES: O=C1/N=C(/N)\C=C/N1[C@@H]2S[C@@H](OC2)CO
- InChI: InChI=1S/C8H11N3O3S/c9-5-1-2-11(8(13)10-5)6-4-14-7(3-12)15-6/h1-2,6-7,12H,3-4H2,(H2,9,10,13)/t6-,7-/m1/s1; Key:RYMCFYKJDVMSIR-RNFRBKRXSA-N

Apricitabine (INN, codenamed AVX754 and SPD754, sometimes abbreviated to ATC) is an experimental nucleoside reverse transcriptase inhibitor (NRTI) against HIV. It is structurally related to lamivudine and emtricitabine, and, like these, is an analogue of cytidine.

== History ==
It was first developed by BioChem Pharma (where it was called BCH10618). BioChem Pharma was then sold to Shire Pharmaceuticals (where apricitabine was called SPD754). Shire then sold the rights to develop the drug to Avexa Pharmaceuticals, an Australian pharmaceutical company. As of 2009, apricitabine has closed its phase III clinical trial, and has been granted fast track status by the United States Food and Drug Administration.

Avexa announced its decision to end work on apricitabine in May 2010, which Avexa spent more than A$100 million ($90 million) developing and was in the final of three stages of patient studies usually needed for U.S. regulatory approval. Grounds for the shutdown included the inability to find commercial partners for global licensing, concerns about legal protections of the drug in the US market, and difficulty confirming the effectiveness of the drug in patients where other retroviral drugs masked key indicators.

In March 2011 it was announced by the company to the Australian Stock Exchange that the FDA had agreed that a new, shorter, single Phase III trial design, including about 300 patients dosed for 2 weeks, was required before approval. A similar agreement with the EMA was announced in March 2012.

In November 2011 the company sought to extend its patents over apricitabine and was in discussions for fast-track approval with European regulators. The company also indicated that clinical trials had shown better-than-expected results from simultaneous provision of the drug alongside two other marketed drugs when compared to those drugs with lamivudine, another NRTI.

Avexa's latest update in 2013 reported that the drug was still in phase IIb trials and had not yet started phase III.

== Dosage ==
As a monotherapy, 1200 mg apricitabine per day reduced the viral load by up to 1.65 logs (45 fold) in a small, 10-day randomized controlled trial. An 800 mg dose twice a day is being used in later studies.

== Adverse effects ==
Apricitabine appears to be well tolerated. The most common side effects associated with its use were headache (although there was no significant difference between participants who took apricitabine and those given a placebo), nasal congestion, and muscle pain. In a six-month trial, common adverse effects were nausea, diarrhea, elevated blood levels of triglycerides, and upper respiratory infection—similar to those of lamivudine; apricitabine was not associated with abnormal lipase levels, bone marrow suppression, or liver and kidney toxicity. No patients in either study had to stop taking apricitabine because of side effects.

== Drug resistance ==
In vitro, apricitabine is effective against NRTI-(lamivudine and zidovudine)-resistant virus strains, including M184V and multiple thymidine analogue mutations (TAMs).

In early studies, no mutations causing drug resistance were observed. Newer trials showed that apricitabine may induce K65R mutations, resulting in resistance against didanosine and tenofovir.

In clinical studies, apricitabine has been good at reducing viral loads while apparently producing little selection pressure, resulting in the addition of no further mutations in treatment-experienced patients with common pre-existing mutations, including M184V or K65R or TAMs (M41L, M184V, and T215Y).
