= Dithioerythritol =

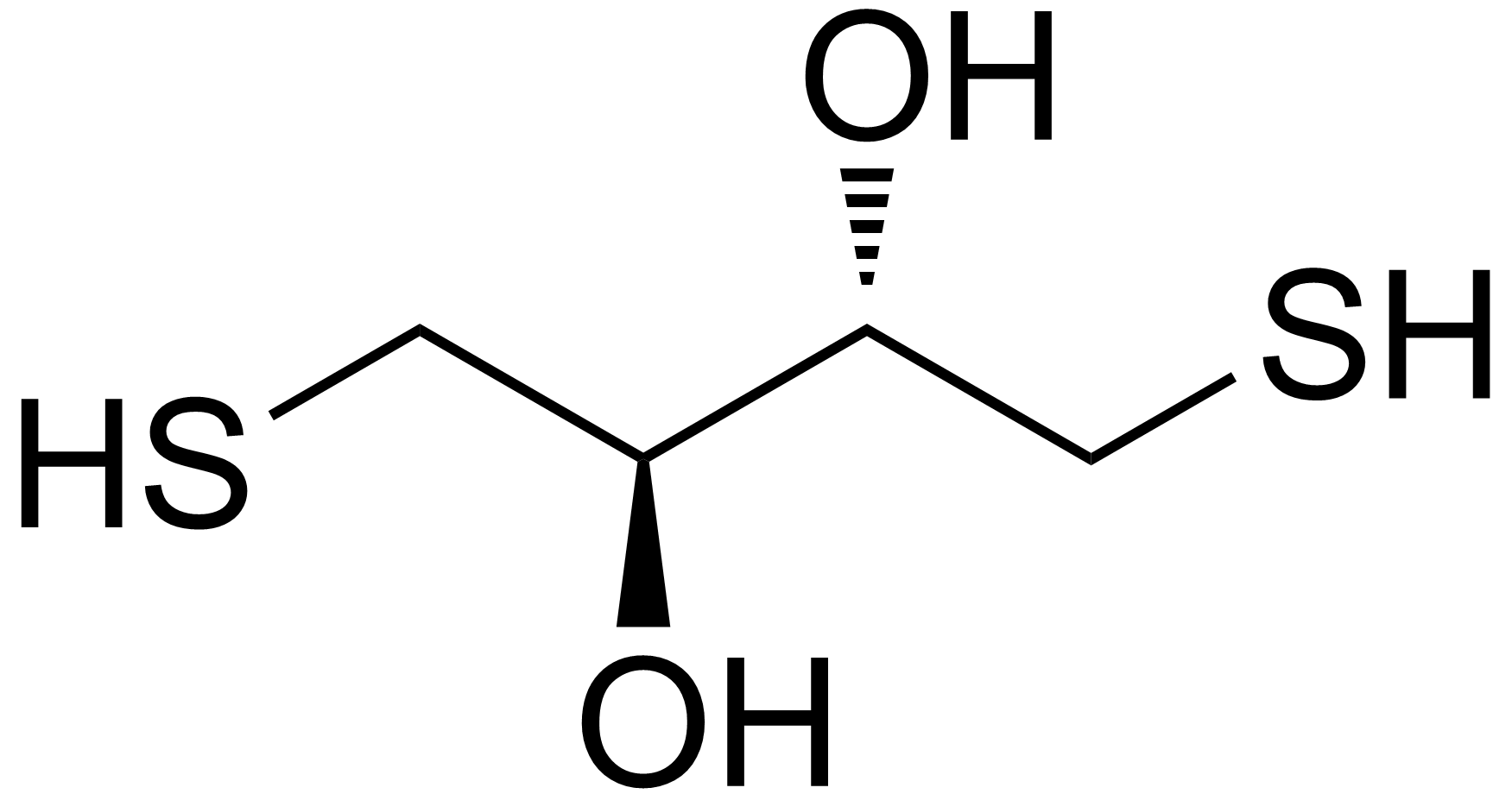

Names
- Preferred IUPAC name (2R,3S)-1,4-Bis(sulfanyl)butane-2,3-diol
- Other names (2R,3S)-1,4-Dimercaptobutane-2,3-diol (no longer recommended); 2,3-Dihydroxybutane-1,4-dithiol; Erythro-2,3-dihydroxy-1,4-butanedithiol; Erythro-1,4-dimercapto-2,3-butanediol; Cleland's reagent (also used for DTT)

Identifiers
CAS Number	6892-68-8
3D model (JSmol)	Interactive image; Interactive image
ChEBI	CHEBI:17456
ChemSpider	388475
ECHA InfoCard	100.027.271
PubChem CID	439352
UNII	R4SVL81GQI
CompTox Dashboard (EPA)	DTXSID40884341
- InChI: InChI=1S/C4H10O2S2/c5-3(1-7)4(6)2-8/h3-8H,1-2H2/t3-,4+ Key: VHJLVAABSRFDPM-ZXZARUISSA-N; InChI=1/C4H10O2S2/c5-3(1-7)4(6)2-8/h3-8H,1-2H2/t3-,4+ Key: VHJLVAABSRFDPM-ZXZARUISBS
- SMILES: C([C@@H]([C@@H](CS)O)O)S; SC[C@@H](O)[C@@H](O)CS

Properties
Chemical formula	C_{4}H_{10}O_{2}S_{2}
Molar mass	154.253 g/mol
Melting point	82 to 84 °C (180 to 183 °F; 355 to 357 K)
- Except where otherwise noted, data are given for materials in their standard state (at 25 °C [77 °F], 100 kPa). verify (what is ?) Infobox references

Dithioerythritol (DTE) is a sulfur containing sugar alcohol derived from the corresponding 4-carbon monosaccharide erythrose. It is an epimer of dithiothreitol (DTT). The molecular formula for DTE is C_{4}H_{10}O_{2}S_{2}.

== Chemical properties ==
DTE is a crystalline solid soluble in water and alcohols.

== Applications ==
Like DTT, DTE makes an excellent reducing agent, which can be used for reduction of disulfide bonds. The reduction potential of DTE is the same as for DTT, about –0.331 V. The pK_{a} values of the thiol groups of DTE are 9.0 and 9.9, which is higher than the corresponding values for DTT (9.3 and 9.5). Since reduction of disulfide bonds requires thiolate (ionized thiol), DTE is less efficient at lower pH compared to DTT.

Reduction with DTE is slower than with DTT. This is presumably because the orientation of the OH groups in its cyclic disulfide-bonded form (oxidized form) is less stable due to greater steric repulsion than their orientation in the disulfide-bonded form of DTT. In the disulfide-bonded form of DTT, these hydroxyl groups are trans to each other, whereas they are cis to each other in DTE.

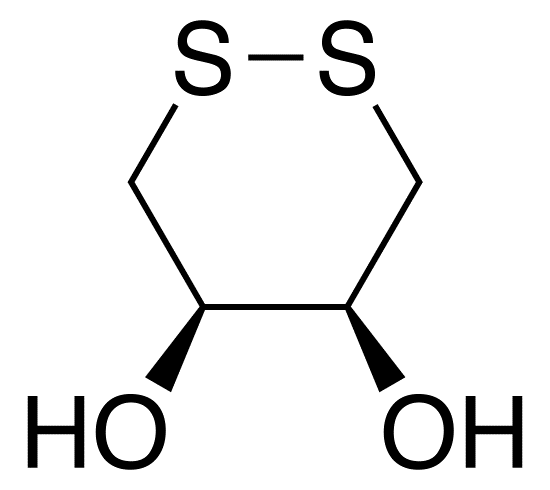
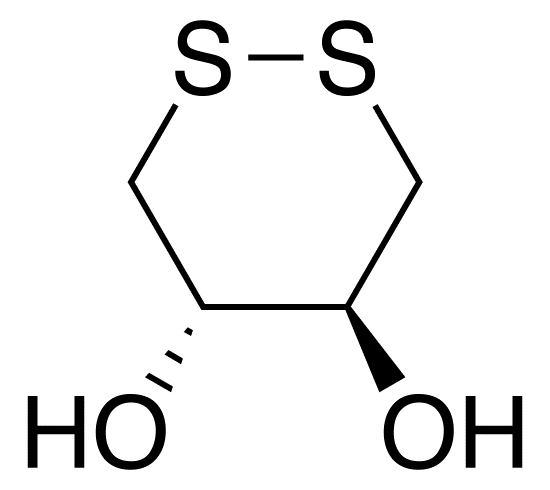
The oxidized forms of dithioerythritol (DTE, left) and dithiothreitol (DTT, right).
