= Asparagine endopeptidase =

Class of enzymes

Legumain
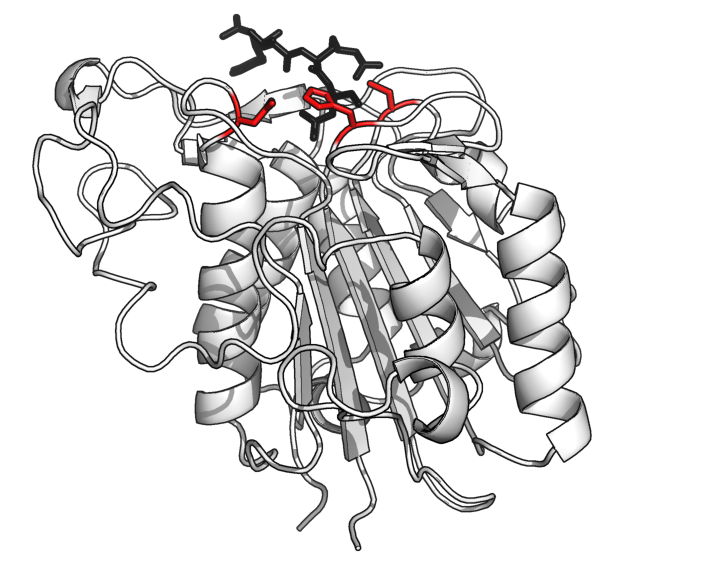
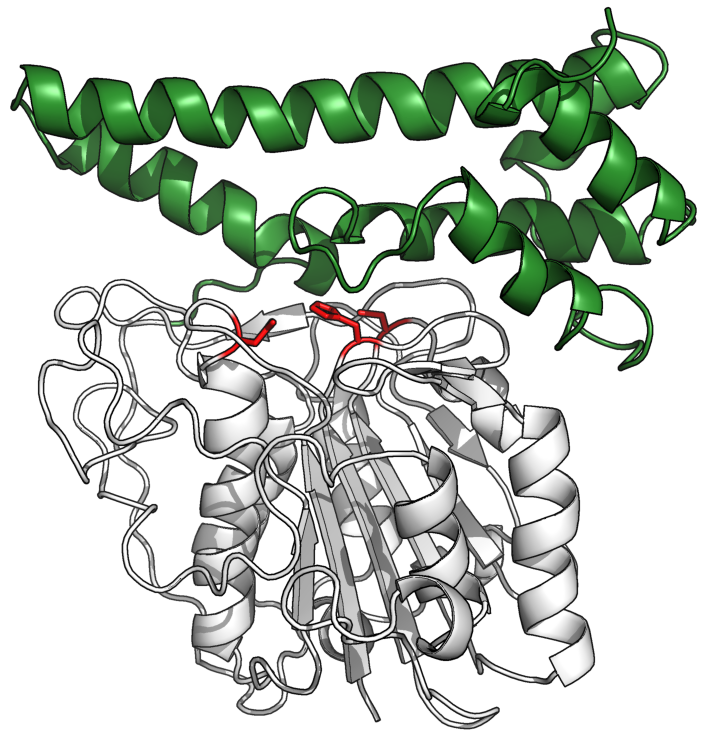
- An example AEP: Human legumain with catalytic triad in red, bound to product in black. (PDB: 4AW9) Human pro-legumain with catalytic triad in red, bound to its auto-inhibitory C-terminal prodomain in green. (PDB: 4FGU)

Identifiers
- EC no.: 3.4.22.34
- CAS no.: 149371-18-6

Databases
- BRENDA: enzyme data
- ExPASy: NiceZyme view
- KEGG: enzyme entry
- MetaCyc: metabolic pathway
- Rhea: reactions
- PDB structures: RCSB PDB PDBe PDBsum
Search
- PMC: articles
- PubMed: articles
- NCBI: proteins

Asparagine endopeptidase (AEP, mammalian legumain, δ-secretase; EC 3.4.22.34) is a proteolytic enzyme from C13 peptidase family which hydrolyses a peptide bond using the thiol group of a cysteine residue as a nucleophile (hence also called cysteine protease). It is also known as asparaginyl endopeptidase, citvac, proteinase B, hemoglobinase, PRSC1 gene product or LGMN (Homo sapiens), vicilin peptidohydrolase and bean endopeptidase. In humans it is encoded by the LGMN gene (previous symbol PRSC1).

It hydrolyzes substrates at the C-terminus of asparagine residues. Discovered in 1996 in beans, its homologues have been identified in plants, protozoa, vertebrates, and helminths. The enzyme has been implicated in several human diseases such as cancer, atherosclerosis and inflammation. It can be detected in spleen, liver, brain, testis tissue and heart and the protein is mostly localised to lysosomes and endosomes. It is also interesting that AEP is activated in age-dependent manner.

== Distribution ==
This enzyme was originally identified in the vacuoles of legume seeds, and was subsequently identified in the lysosomes of mammals and Schistosoma mansoni. They are now known to be present in a range of plants and animals.

== Activity ==
=== Reaction and specificity ===
This enzyme catalyses the following chemical reaction:

Hydrolysis of proteins and small molecule substrates at -Asn-Xaa- bonds

Both plant and animal legumains are most active in acidic environments.

=== Prodomain processing ===
Legmains are produced as inactive precursor zymogens. their C-terminal domain binds over their active site (where a substrate would normally bind), inhibiting activity. Once in the acidic environment of the vacuole or lysosome, the prodomain is cleaved off to reveal the active enzyme.

=== Mechanism ===
Legumain is a cysteine protease from the C13 family of the CD clan of proteases (MEROPS). It uses a catalytic triad of Cysteine-Histidine-Asparagine in its active site to perform covalent proteolysis of its substrate.

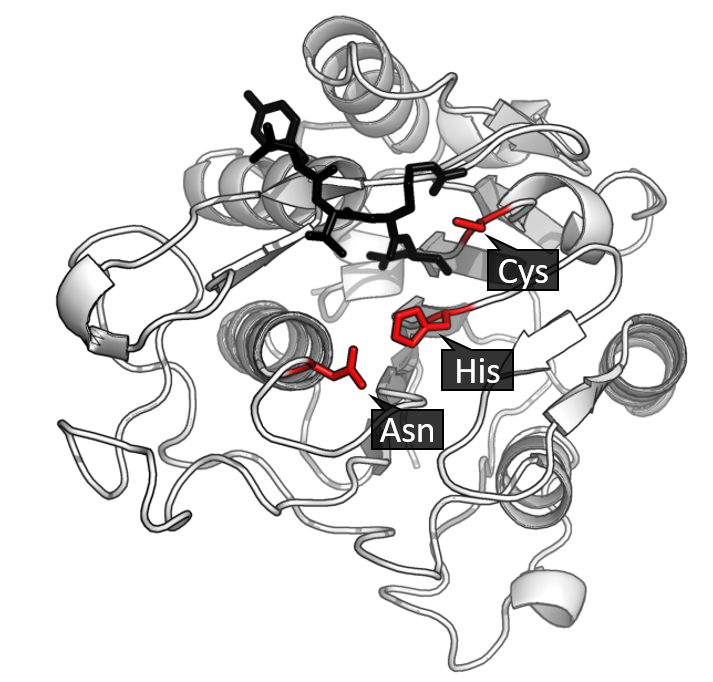
Active site of human legumain with catalytic triad in red, bound to product in black. (PDB: 4AW9)

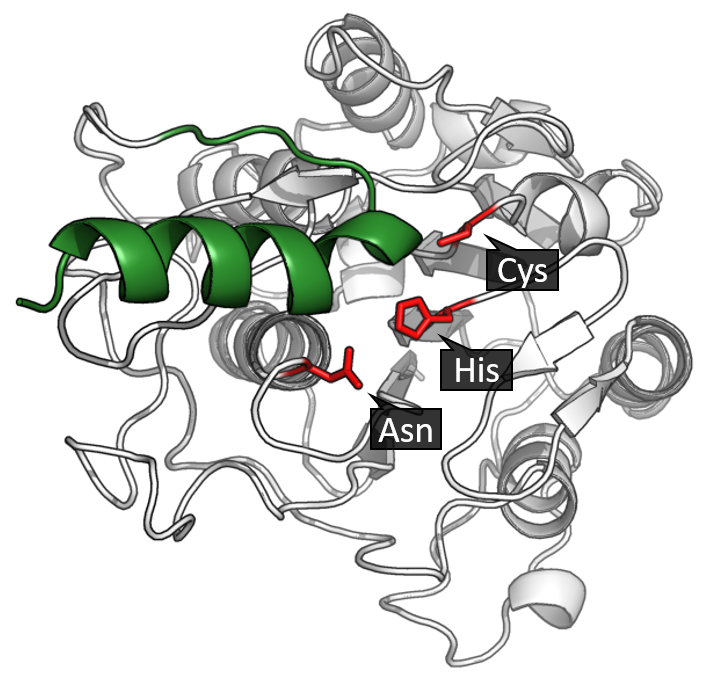
Active site of human legumain with catalytic triad in red, bound to its auto-inhibitory C-terminal prodomain in green. (PDB: 4FGU)

=== Activation ===
Asparagine endopeptidase is synthesized as an inactive zymogen. AEP and other cysteine peptidase are activated when pH changes from neutral to acidic. It undergoes autoproteolytic maturation for catalytic activation. It appears to be autocatalytically cleaved after asparagine or aspartate residue. Activation begins at pH 4.5. The chemical structure at this point shows that breaks which occurs at pH 4.5 can be healed under the basic crystallization conditions. C-terminal fragments (≈13 kDa) generated during autoproteolysis can gradually re-ligated to form the proenzyme when the pH is increased towards pH 7.5, which means that proteolytic activation of AEP can be reversible.

== Biological roles ==
=== Antimicrobial activity ===
In plant Oldenlandia affinis it generates antimicrobial cyclic peptides which are important for defence against pathogens in plants. The herb has been used in native African medicine to accelerate childbirth.

=== Animals ===
==== Innate immune system ====
There are many regulators which affect immune system and help to keep it balanced. If the immune system is too active there is a danger of developing an autoimmune disease, while passive immune system will lead to infections or cancer. Antigen presenting is a key role in activation of immune system. It has been discovered that AEP plays role in this critical moment. AEP is involved in presenting of foreign and self proteins using MHCII protein complex. The role of AEP in immunity is not clear, but it seems that it is connected with checkpoint inhibitors such as PD-1, which downregulates AEP which is key to shifting the balance between cancer fighting cells and regulatory T cells. In the absence of AEP, inhibitory checkpoints may not have a beneficial response. Measuring of this enzyme in patients could predict which one of them may provide better response to treatment.

==== Signalling ====
In innate immunity TLRs play an important role. These TLRs (mainly TLR7 and TLR9) can be proteolytically activated by AEP. The reduction of proinflammatory cytokines by stimulating TLR9 was found in myeloid cells and plasmacytoid dendritic cells which lacked AEP. Enzyme is also important in processing of influenza virus and immune response using TLR7. AEP plays a critical role in TLR processing. and AEP can initiate removal of invariant chain in MHC-II complex, which can critically influence peptide generation and activity of MHCII.

== Disease ==
=== Neurodegenerative diseases ===
AEP is activated during brain ischemia or brain acidosis and epilepsia seizure. It digests SET protein, which is an inhibitor of DNase, leading to DNA damage and causing damage of the brain. Increased activity of AEP in brain is also observed in patients with Alzheimer's disease and Parkinson's disease (PD). AEP cleaves tau protein and amyloid precursor protein. In patients with PD, alpha synuclein is cut by AEP into toxic chunks., which are hypothesized to possibly play a role in the initiation or pathogenesis of PD

==== Alzheimer's disease ====
Active AEP was found at increased levels and translocated to the cytoplasm of neuronal cells of AD patients. In AD the plaques are composed of amyloid beta, intracellular neurofibrillary tangles and tau protein. The dysfunction of APP proteolysis and the abnormal phosphorylation of tau lead to the formation of neuritic plaques and neurofibrillary tangles (NFTs), respectively, causing neuronal degeneration and dementia It also play a crucial role in behavior disorders connected with AD such as anxiety and depression. It also plays a role in stroke. Since stroke elicits acidity in the brain AEP become active due to low pH level. Then it cleaves SET which causes death of brain cells. Targeting of AEP might help to prevent onset of AD symptoms. Development of AEP-selective inhibitors (such as Cbz-L-Ala-L-Ala-AzaAsnchloromethylketone and aza-peptidyl AEP inhibitors) is crucial for helping with diseases.
