= Dithiothreitol =

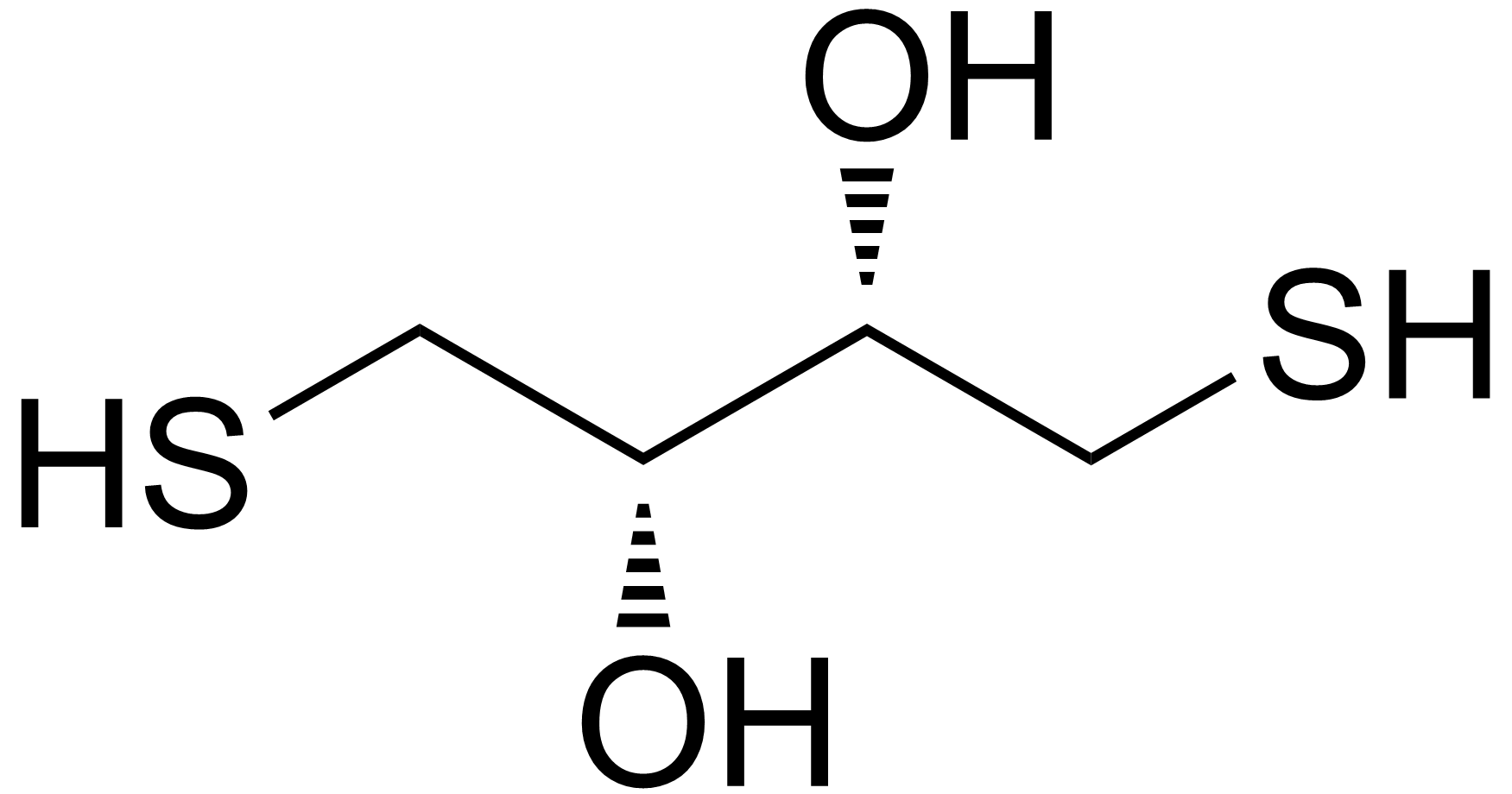

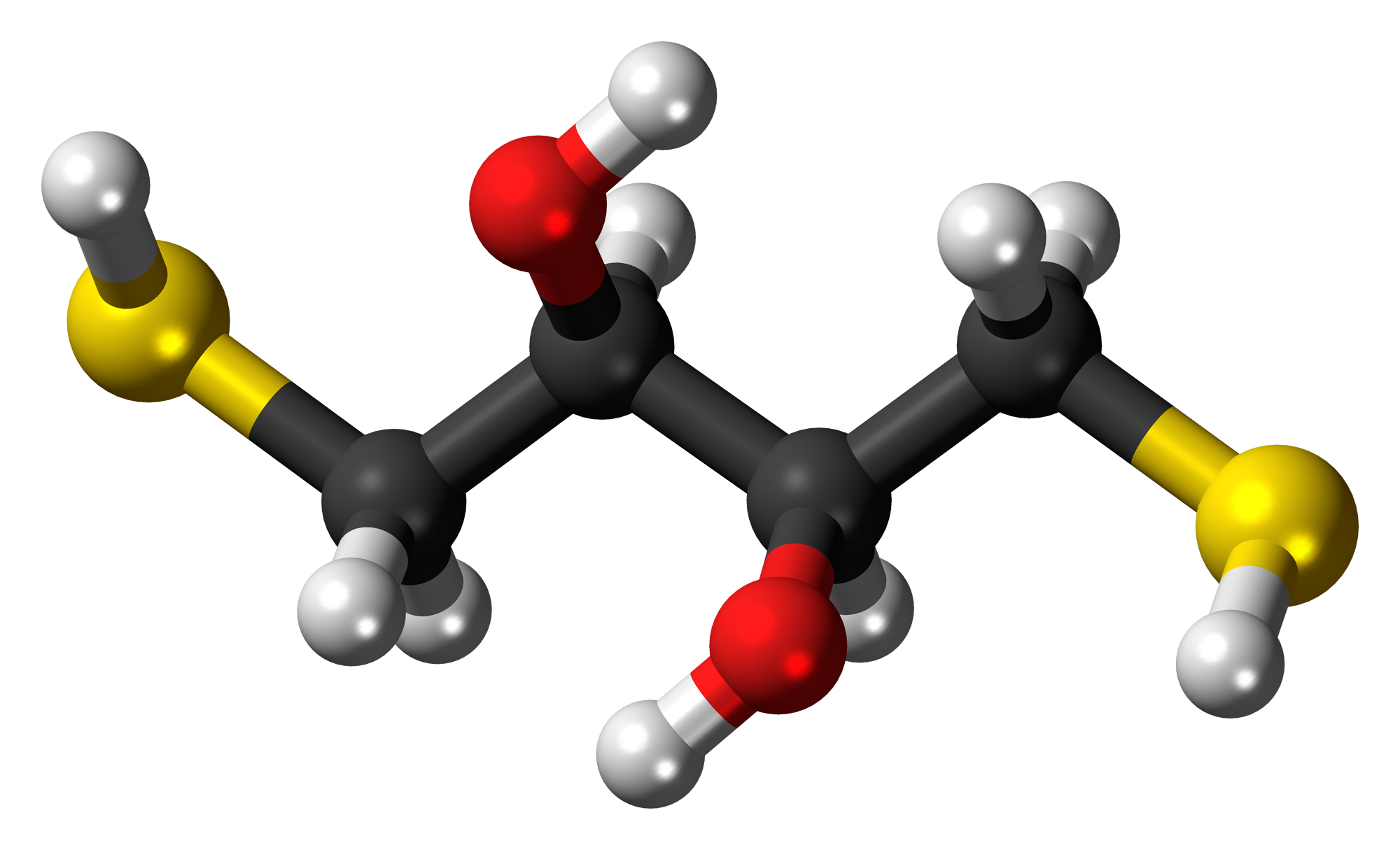

Names
- Preferred IUPAC name (2S,3S)-1,4-Bis(sulfanyl)butane-2,3-diol
- Other names (2S,3S)-1,4-Dimercaptobutane-2,3-diol; D-threo-1,4-Dimercaptobutane-2,3-diol; D-threo-1,4-Dimercapto-2,3-butanediol; 1,4-Dithio-D-threitol; Cleland's reagent Reductacryl

Identifiers
CAS Number	3483-12-3
3D model (JSmol)	Interactive image
ChEBI	CHEBI:42170
ChEMBL	ChEMBL1232392
ChemSpider	393541
DrugBank	DB04447
ECHA InfoCard	100.020.427
PubChem CID	446094
UNII	T8ID5YZU6Y
CompTox Dashboard (EPA)	DTXSID5041017
- InChI: InChI=1S/C4H10O2S2/c5-3(1-7)4(6)2-8/h3-8H,1-2H2/t3-,4-/m1/s1 Key: VHJLVAABSRFDPM-QWWZWVQMSA-N; InChI=1/C4H10O2S2/c5-3(1-7)4(6)2-8/h3-8H,1-2H2/t3-,4-/m1/s1 Key: VHJLVAABSRFDPM-QWWZWVQMBU
- SMILES: C([C@H]([C@@H](CS)O)O)S

Properties
Chemical formula	C_{4}H_{10}O_{2}S_{2}
Molar mass	154.253 g/mol
Appearance	Colorless solid
Melting point	42 to 43 °C (108 to 109 °F; 315 to 316 K)
Boiling point	125 to 130 °C (257 to 266 °F; 398 to 403 K) at 2 mmHg
Solubility in water	Soluble
- Except where otherwise noted, data are given for materials in their standard state (at 25 °C [77 °F], 100 kPa). verify (what is ?) Infobox references

Dithiothreitol (DTT) is an organosulfur compound with the formula (CH(OH)CH_{2}SH)_{2}. A colorless compound, it is classified as a dithiol and a diol. DTT is redox reagent also known as Cleland's reagent, after W. Wallace Cleland. The reagent is commonly used in its racemic form. Its name derives from the four-carbon sugar, threose. DTT has an epimeric ('sister') compound, dithioerythritol (DTE).

== Synthesis ==
The traditional route to dithiothreitol (and its isomer dithioerythritol) is sulfidation of the extremely lachrymatory 1,4-Dibromobut-2-ene. Modern industrial syntheses instead use related epoxides and hydrogen sulfide.

== Reducing agent ==
DTT is a reducing agent; once oxidized, it forms a stable six-membered ring with an internal disulfide bond. It has a redox potential of −0.33 V at pH 7. The reduction of a typical disulfide bond proceeds by two sequential thiol-disulfide exchange reactions and is illustrated below. The reduction usually does not stop at the mixed-disulfide species because the second thiol of DTT has a high propensity to close the ring, forming oxidized DTT and leaving behind a reduced disulfide bond. The reducing power of DTT is limited to pH values above 7, since only the negatively charged thiolate form -S^{−} is reactive (the protonated thiol form -SH is not); the pKa of the thiol groups is 9.2 and 10.1.

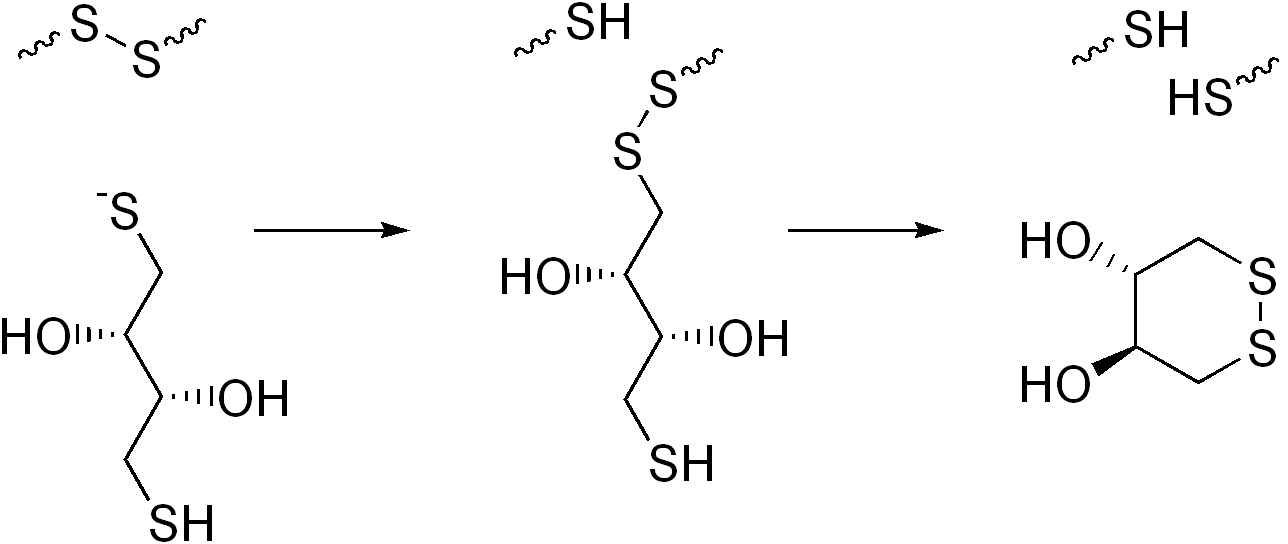
Reduction of a typical disulfide bond by DTT via two sequential thiol-disulfide exchange reactions.

== Applications ==
DTT is used as a reducing or "deprotecting" agent for thiolated DNA. The terminal sulfur atoms of thiolated DNA have a tendency to form dimers in solution, especially in the presence of oxygen. Dimerization greatly lowers the efficiency of subsequent coupling reactions such as DNA immobilization on gold in biosensors. Typically DTT is mixed with a DNA solution and allowed to react, and then is removed by filtration (for the solid catalyst) or by chromatography (for the liquid form). The DTT removal procedure is often called "desalting." Generally, DTT is used as a protecting agent that prevents oxidation of thiol groups.

DTT is frequently used to reduce the disulfide bonds of proteins and, more generally, to prevent intramolecular and intermolecular disulfide bonds from forming between cysteine residues of proteins. However, even DTT cannot reduce buried (solvent-inaccessible) disulfide bonds, so reduction of disulfide bonds is sometimes carried out under denaturing conditions (e.g., at high temperatures, or in the presence of a strong denaturant such as 6 M guanidinium chloride, 8 M urea, or 1% sodium dodecylsulfate). DTT is oftentimes used along with sodium dodecylsulfate in SDS-PAGE to further denature proteins by reducing their disulfide bonds to allow for better separation of proteins during electrophoresis. Because of the ability to reduce disulfide bonds, DTT can be used to denature CD38 on red blood cells. DTT will also denature antigens in the Kell, Lutheran, Dombrock, Cromer, Cartwright, LW and Knops blood group systems. Conversely, the solvent exposure of different disulfide bonds can be assayed by their rate of reduction in the presence of DTT.

DTT can also be used as an oxidizing agent. Its principal advantage is that effectively no mixed-disulfide species are populated, in contrast to other agents such as glutathione. In very rare cases, a DTT adduct may be formed, i.e., the two sulfur atoms of DTT may form disulfide bonds to different sulfur atoms; in such cases, DTT cannot cyclize since it has no such remaining free thiols.

== Properties ==
DTT is oxidized by air. So it is normally stored and handled under inert atmosphere to minimize oxidation. The rate of air-oxidation is slower at low temperatures. Oxidized DTT exhibits a strong absorbance peak at 280 nm. Since thiols are less nucleophilic than their conjugate bases, thiolates, DTT becomes a less potent nucleophile as the pH falls. (2S)-2-Amino-1,4-dimercaptobutane (dithiobutylamine or DTBA), a related dithiol reducing agent, somewhat overcomes this limitation of DTT. Tris(2-carboxyethyl)phosphine (TCEP) is an alternative reducing agent that is more stable and effective at low pH, but it is bulky and reduces cystines in folded proteins only slowly.

DTT's half-life is 40 hours at pH 6.5 and 1.4 hours at pH 8.5 and 20 °C; its half-life decreases further as temperature increases. The presence of EDTA (ethylenediaminetetraacetic acid) to chelate divalent metal ions considerably extends the half-life of DTT in solution.

== See also ==
- Dithiobutylamine (DTBA)
- 2-Mercaptoethanol (BME)
- TCEP
- Thioglycolic acid#History
