= Ponceau S =

Names
- IUPAC name tetrasodium;3-hydroxy-4-[[2-sulfonato-4-[(4-sulfonatophenyl)diazenyl]phenyl]diazenyl]naphthalene-2,7-disulfonate
- Other names Acid red 112

Identifiers
CAS Number	6226-79-5
3D model (JSmol)	Interactive image
ChEBI	CHEBI:90319
ChemSpider	11455708
ECHA InfoCard	100.025.745
EC Number	228-319-2
PubChem CID	2723873
UNII	T1C2UGS05F
CompTox Dashboard (EPA)	DTXSID60889378
- InChI: Key: KQHKSGRIBYJYFX-UHFFFAOYSA-J; InChI=1S/C22H16N4O13S4/c27-22-20(43(37,38)39)10-12-9-16(41(31,32)33)6-7-17(12)21(22)26-25-18-8-3-14(11-19(18)42(34,35)36)24-23-13-1-4-15(5-2-13)40(28,29)30/h1-11,27H,(H,28,29,30)(H,31,32,33)(H,34,35,36)(H,37,38,39)/b24-23+,26-25+
- SMILES: OC1=C(N=NC3=CC=C(N=NC4=CC=C(S(=O)(O)=O)C=C4)C=C3S(=O)(O)=O)C2=C(C=C(S(=O)(O)=O)C=C2)C=C1S(=O)(O)=O

Properties
Chemical formula	C_{22}H_{16}N_{4}O_{13}S_{4}
Molar mass	672.63 g·mol^{−1}

Hazards
- GHS labelling
Pictograms	(GHS07: Exclamation mark)
Signal word	Warning
Hazard statements	H315, H319, H335
Precautionary statements	P261, P264, P271, P280, P302+P352, P304+P340, P305+P351+P338, P312, P321, P332+P313, P337+P313, P362, P403+P233, P405, P501
- Except where otherwise noted, data are given for materials in their standard state (at 25 °C [77 °F], 100 kPa). Infobox references

Ponceau S, Acid Red 112, or C.I. 27195 (systematic name: 3-hydroxy-4-(2-sulfo-4-[4-sulfophenylazo]phenylazo)-2,7-naphthalenedisulfonic acid sodium salt) is a sodium salt of a diazo dye of a light red color, that may be used to prepare a stain for rapid reversible detection of protein bands on nitrocellulose or polyvinylidene fluoride (PVDF) membranes (western blotting), as well as on cellulose acetate membranes. A Ponceau S stain is useful because it does not appear to have a deleterious effect on the sequencing of blotted polypeptides and is therefore one method of choice for locating polypeptides on western blots for blot-sequencing.It is also easily reversed with water washes, facilitating subsequent immunological detection. The stain can be completely removed from the protein bands by continued washing.Common stain formulations include 0.1% (w/v) Ponceau S in 5% acetic acid or 2% (w/v) Ponceau S in 30% trichloroacetic acid and 30% sulfosalicylic acid.

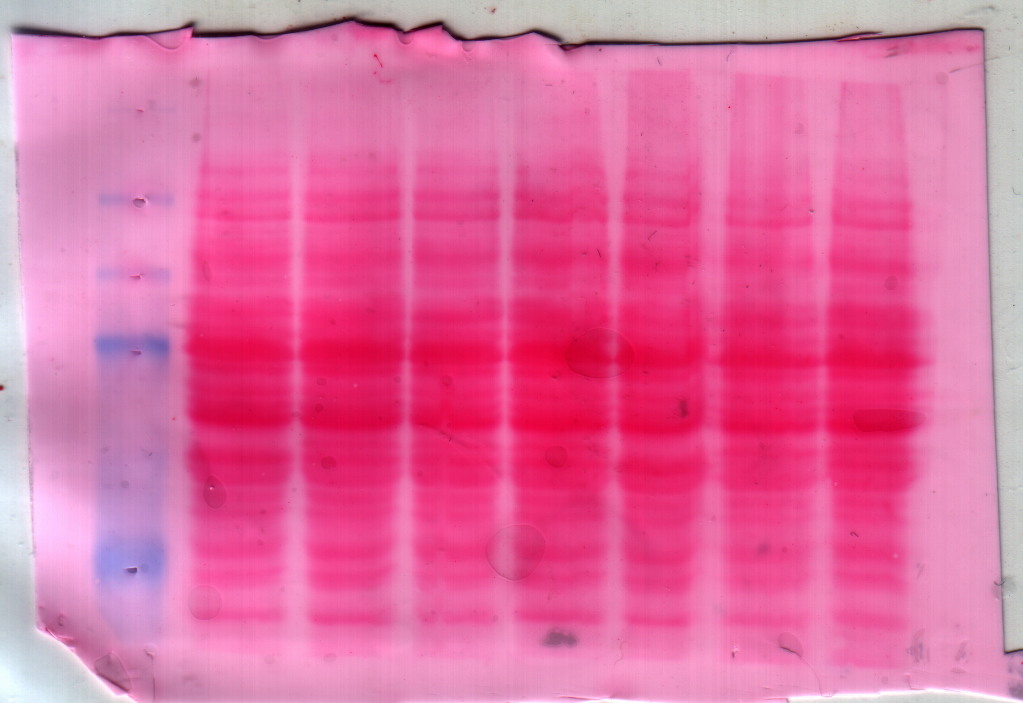
A nitrocellulose membrane stained with Ponceau S dye for protein detection during western blotting. The blue bands on the left are protein markers for various molecular weights.

== See also ==
- Coomassie brilliant blue
- Western blot normalization
