= Western blot normalization =

Normalization of Western blot data is an analytical step that is performed to compare the relative abundance of a specific protein across the lanes of a blot or gel under diverse experimental treatments, or across tissues or developmental stages. The overall goal of normalization is to minimize effects arising from variations in experimental errors, such as inconsistent sample preparation, unequal sample loading across gel lanes, or uneven protein transfer, which can compromise the conclusions that can be obtained from Western blot data. Currently, there are two methods for normalizing Western blot data: (i) housekeeping protein normalization and (ii) total protein normalization.

== Procedure ==
Normalization occurs directly on either the gel or the blotting membrane. First, the stained gel or blot is imaged, a rectangle is drawn around the target protein in each lane, and the signal intensity inside the rectangle is measured. The signal intensity obtained can then be normalized with respect to the signal intensity of the loading internal control detected on the same gel or blot. When using protein stains, the membrane may be incubated with the chosen stain before or after immunodetection, depending on the type of stain.

== Housekeeping protein controls ==
Housekeeping genes and proteins, including β-Actin, GAPDH, HPRT1, and RPLP1, are often used as internal controls in western blots because they are thought to be expressed constitutively, at the same levels, across experiments. However, recent studies have shown that expression of housekeeping proteins (HKPs) can change across different cell types and biological conditions. Therefore, scientific publishers and funding agencies now require that normalization controls be previously validated for each experiment to ensure reproducibility and accuracy of the results.

=== Fluorescent antibodies ===
When using fluorescent antibodies to image proteins in western blots, normalization requires that the user define the upper and lower limits of quantitation and characterize the linear relationship between signal intensity and the sample mass volume for each antigen. Both the target protein and the normalization control need to fluoresce within the dynamic range of detection. Many HKPs are expressed at high levels and are preferred for use with highly-expressed target proteins. Lower expressing proteins are difficult to detect on the same blot.

Fluorescent antibodies are commercially available, and fully characterized antibodies are recommended to ensure consistency of results.

When fluorescent detection is not utilized, the loading control protein and the protein of interest must differ considerably in molecular weight so they are adequately separated by gel electrophoresis for accurate analysis.

=== Membrane stripping ===
Membranes need to be stripped and re-probed using a new set of detection antibodies when detecting multiple protein targets on the same blot. Ineffective stripping could result in a weak signal from the target protein. To prevent loss of the antigen, only three stripping incubations are recommended per membrane. It could be difficult to completely eliminate signal from highly-abundant proteins, so it is recommended that one detects lowly-expressed proteins first.

=== Exogenous spike-in controls ===
Since HKP levels can be inconsistent between tissues, scientists can control for the protein of interest by spiking in a pure, exogenous protein of a known concentration within the linear range of the antibody. Compared to HKP, a wider variety of proteins are available for spike-in controls.

== Total protein normalization ==
In total protein normalization (TPN), the abundance of the target protein is normalized to the total amount of protein in each lane. Because TPN is not dependent on a single loading control, validation of controls and stripping/reprobing of blots for detection of HKPs is not necessary. This can improve precision (down to 0.1 μg of total protein per lane), cost-effectiveness, and data reliability.

Fluorescent stains and stain-free gels require special equipment to visualize the proteins on the gel/blot. Stains may not cover the blot evenly; more stain might collect towards the edges of the blot than in the center. Non-uniformity in the image can result in inaccurate normalization.

=== Pre-antibody stains ===
Anionic dyes such as Ponceau S and Coomassie brilliant blue, and fluorescent dyes like Sypro Ruby and Deep Purple, are used before antibodies are added because they do not affect downstream immunodetection.

Ponceau S is a negatively charged reversible dye that stains proteins a reddish pink color and is removed easily by washing in water. The intensity of Ponceau S staining decreases quickly over time, so documentation should be conducted rapidly. A linear range of up to 140 μg is reported for Ponceau S with poor reproducibility due to its highly time-dependent staining intensity and low signal-to-noise ratio.

Fluorescent dyes like Sypro Ruby have a broad linear range and are more sensitive than anionic dyes. They are permanent, photostable stains that can be visualized with a standard UV or blue-light transilluminator or a laser scan. Membranes can then be documented either on film or digitally using a charge-coupled device camera. Sypro Ruby blot staining is time-intensive and tends to saturate above 50 μg of protein per lane.

=== Post-antibody stains ===
Amido black is a commonly used permanent post-antibody anionic stain that is more sensitive than Ponceau S. This stain is applied after immunodetection.

=== Stain-free technology ===
Stain-free technology employs an in-gel chemistry for imaging. This chemical reaction does not affect protein transfer or downstream antibody binding. Also, it does not involve staining/destaining steps, and the intensity of the bands remain constant over time.

Stain-free technology cannot detect proteins that do not contain tryptophan residues. A minimum of two tryptophans is needed to enable detection. The linear range for stain-free normalization is up to 80 μg of protein per lane for 18-well and up to 100 μg per lane for 12-well Criterion mid-sized gels. This range is compatible with typical protein loads in quantitative western blots and enables loading control calculations over a wide protein-loading range. A more efficient stain-free method has also recently become available. When using high protein loads, stain-free technology has demonstrated greater success than stains.
