= MZF1 =

Protein-coding gene in the species Homo sapiens

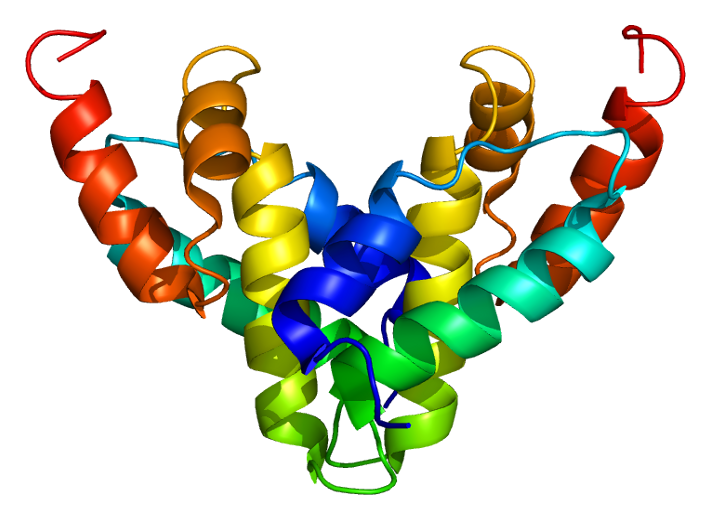

Identifiers
- Aliases: MZF1, MZF-1, MZF1B, ZFP98, ZNF42, ZSCAN6, myeloid zinc finger 1
- External IDs: OMIM: 194550; MGI: 107457; GeneCards: MZF1
Available structures
PDB	Human UniProt search: PDBe RCSB
PDB	List of PDB id codes 2FI2

Gene location (Human)
Chr.	Chromosome 19 (human)
Band	19q13.43	Start	58,561,931 bp
Band	19q13.43	End	58,573,575 bp

Gene location (Mouse)
Chr.	Chromosome 7 (mouse)
Band	7 A1|7 7.73 cM	Start	12,776,230 bp
Band	7 A1|7 7.73 cM	End	12,788,691 bp
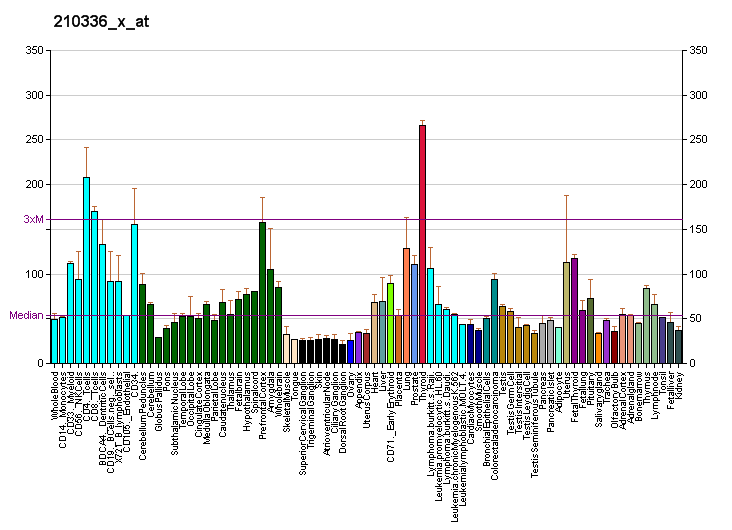

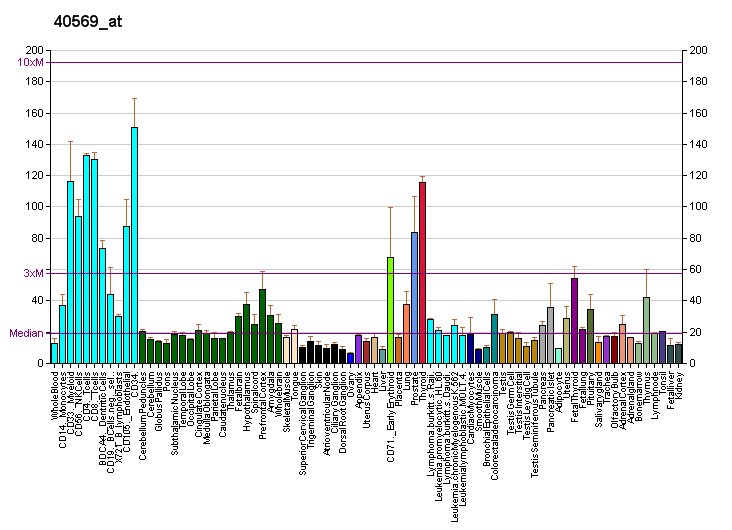

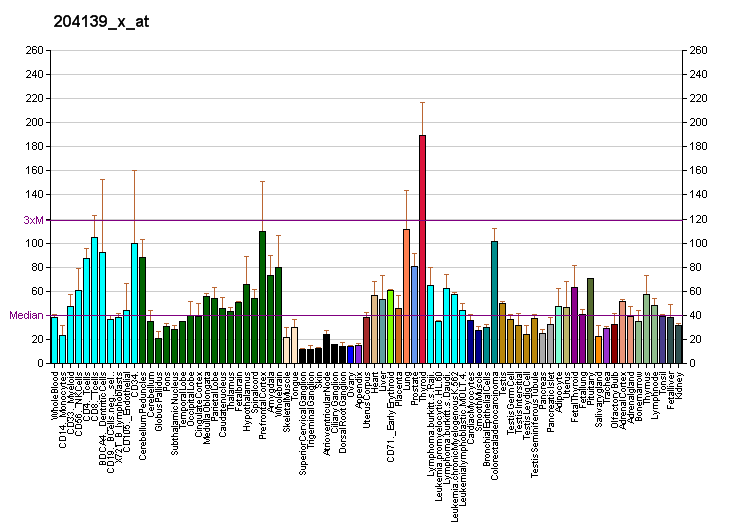
RNA expression pattern
Bgee	Human / Mouse (ortholog); Top expressed in: pancreatic ductal cell; right uterine tube; right lobe of thyroid gland; right hemisphere of cerebellum; pituitary gland; left lobe of thyroid gland; anterior pituitary; right adrenal gland; right adrenal cortex; left ovary / Top expressed in: male urethra; superior frontal gyrus; primary visual cortex; neural layer of retina; dentate gyrus of hippocampal formation granule cell; spermatid; spermatocyte; granulocyte; tail of embryo; embryo; More reference expression data
BioGPS	More reference expression data
Gene ontology
Molecular function	DNA-binding transcription activator activity, RNA polymerase II-specific; protein homodimerization activity; DNA binding; protein binding; nucleic acid binding; metal ion binding; RNA polymerase II cis-regulatory region sequence-specific DNA binding; DNA-binding transcription repressor activity, RNA polymerase II-specific; DNA-binding transcription factor activity; DNA-binding transcription factor activity, RNA polymerase II-specific
Cellular component	nucleus
Biological process	positive regulation of transcription by RNA polymerase II; transcription, DNA-templated; negative regulation of transcription by RNA polymerase II; regulation of transcription, DNA-templated; transcription by RNA polymerase II
Sources:Amigo / QuickGO
Orthologs
Databases	NCBI: entry; OMA: entry
Species	Human	Mouse
Entrez	7593	109889
Ensembl	ENSG00000099326	ENSMUSG00000030380
UniProt	P28698	n/a
RefSeq (mRNA)	NM_001267033; NM_003422; NM_198055	NM_001290452; NM_001290453; NM_145819; NM_001382820; NM_016793
RefSeq (protein)	NP_001253962; NP_003413; NP_932172	n/a
Location (UCSC)	Chr 19: 58.56 – 58.57 Mb	Chr 7: 12.78 – 12.79 Mb
PubMed search
- Wikidata
View/Edit Human	View/Edit Mouse

Myeloid zinc finger 1 is a protein that in humans is encoded by the MZF1 gene.

== Interactions ==
MZF1 has been shown to interact with SCAND1. In 2014, the laboratory of Nathan H. Lents showed that MZF-1 induces the GAPDH gene, something that must be considered when GAPDH is used as a loading control in experiments that may induce or perturb MZF-1. The same group later showed that MZF-1 induces CTGF and NOV, two members of the CCN gene family.
