= C15H20O5 =

The molecular formula C_{15}H_{20}O_{5} (molar mass: 280.316 g/mol, exact mass: 280.1311 u) may refer to:

- Koningic acid, or heptelidic acid
- Phaseic acid
- Psilostachyin A
