= Electroblotting =

Process in biochemistry

Schematic representation of a transfer stack.

Electroblotting is a method in molecular biology/biochemistry/immunogenetics to transfer proteins or nucleic acids onto a membrane by using PVDF or nitrocellulose, after gel electrophoresis. The protein or nucleic acid can then be further analyzed using probes such as specific antibodies, ligands like lectins, or stains. This method can be used with all polyacrylamide and agarose gels. An alternative technique for transferring proteins from a gel is capillary blotting.

== Development ==
This technique was patented in 1989 by William J. Littlehales under the title "Electroblotting technique for transferring specimens from a polyacrylamide electrophoresis or like gel onto a membrane.

== Electroblotting procedure ==
This technique relies upon current and a transfer buffer solution to drive proteins or nucleic acids onto a membrane. Following electrophoresis, a standard tank or semi-dry blotting transfer system is set up. A stack is put together in the following order from cathode to anode: sponge | three sheets of filter paper soaked in transfer buffer | gel | PVDF or nitrocellulose membrane | three sheets of filter paper soaked in transfer buffer | sponge. It is a necessity that the membrane is located between the gel and the positively charged anode, as the current and sample will be moving in that direction. Once the stack is prepared, it is placed in the transfer system, and a current of suitable magnitude is applied for a suitable period of time according to the materials being used.

Typically the electrophoresis gel is stained with Coomassie brilliant blue following the transfer to ensure that a sufficient quantity of material has been transferred. Because the proteins may retain or regain part of their structure during blotting they may react with specific antibodies giving rise to the term immunoblotting. Alternatively the proteins may react with ligands like lectins giving rise to the term affinity blotting.

== See also ==
- Western blotting
- SDS-page
