= SCAND3 =

Protein-coding gene in humans

Identifiers
- Aliases: SCAND3, Buster4, ZFP38-L, ZNF305P2, ZNF452, dJ1186N24.3, zinc finger BED-type containing 9, ZBED9, SCAN domain containing 3
- External IDs: OMIM: 615254; GeneCards: SCAND3

Gene location (Human)
Chr.	Chromosome 6 (human)
Band	6p22.1	Start	28,570,535 bp
Band	6p22.1	End	28,616,212 bp
RNA expression pattern
Bgee	Human / Mouse (ortholog); Top expressed in: gonad; left testis; right testis; secondary oocyte; testicle; ganglionic eminence; corpus epididymis; ventricular zone; islet of Langerhans; sperm / n/a; More reference expression data
BioGPS	n/a
Gene ontology
Molecular function	DNA-binding transcription factor activity; nucleic acid binding; DNA-binding transcription factor activity, RNA polymerase II-specific; DNA binding
Cellular component	cytoplasm; nucleoplasm
Biological process	regulation of transcription, DNA-templated; DNA integration; regulation of transcription by RNA polymerase II
Sources:Amigo / QuickGO
Orthologs
Databases	NCBI: entry; OMA: entry
Species	Human	Mouse
Entrez	114821	n/a
Ensembl	ENSG00000248496; ENSG00000232040	n/a
UniProt	Q6R2W3	n/a
RefSeq (mRNA)	NM_052923; NM_001329616	n/a
RefSeq (protein)	NP_001316545; NP_443155	n/a
Location (UCSC)	Chr 6: 28.57 – 28.62 Mb	n/a
PubMed search		n/a
- Wikidata
View/Edit Human

SCAN domain-containing protein 3 is a protein that in humans is encoded by the SCAND3 gene (previously ZNF452). SCAND3 is over-expressed in non-small-cell lung carcinoma and has been identified as a potential oncogene. This gene may have originally been a transposon that stopped being able to translocate.

== See also ==
- SCAND1
