= Beta-actin =

Protein-coding gene in the species Homo sapiens

ACTB
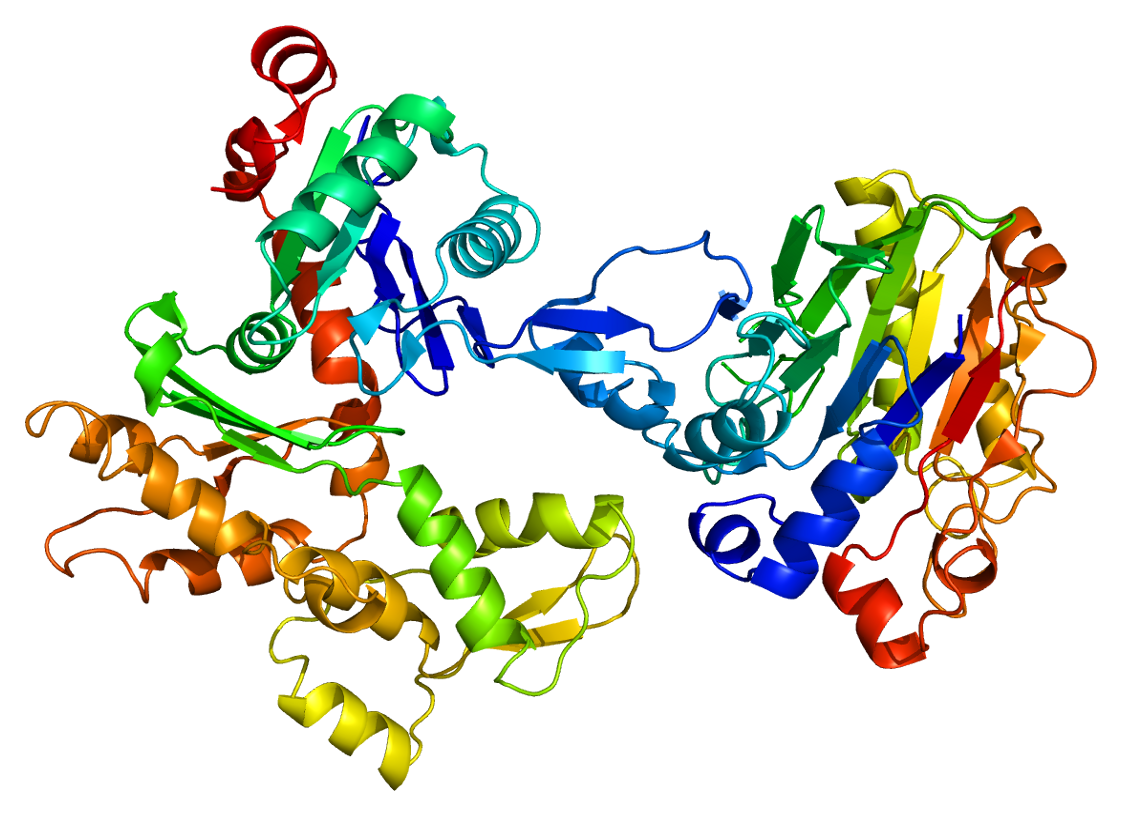

Identifiers
- Aliases: ACTB, BRWS1, PS1TP5BP1, Beta-actin, actin, beta, actin beta
- External IDs: OMIM: 102630; MGI: 87904; GeneCards: ACTB
Available structures
PDB	Ortholog search: PDBe RCSB
PDB	List of PDB id codes 3BYH, 3D2U, 3J82, 3LUE

Gene location (Human)
Chr.	Chromosome 7 (human)
Band	7p22.1	Start	5,526,409 bp
Band	7p22.1	End	5,563,902 bp

Gene location (Mouse)
Chr.	Chromosome 5 (mouse)
Band	5 G2|5 81.8 cM	Start	142,888,870 bp
Band	5 G2|5 81.8 cM	End	142,892,509 bp
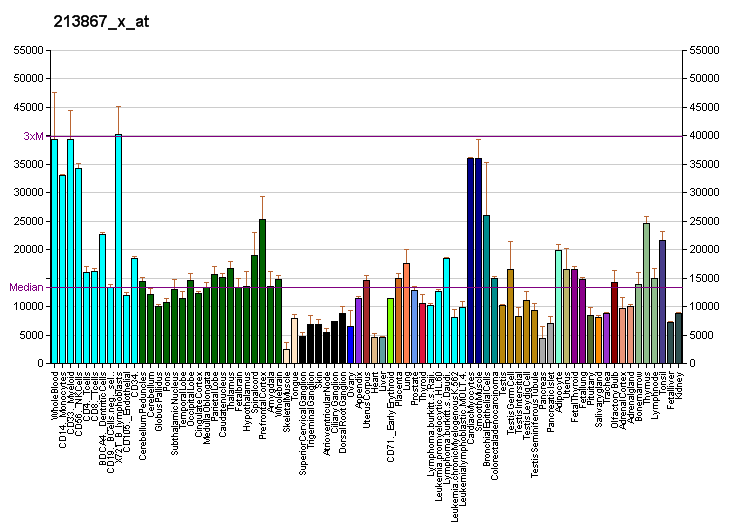

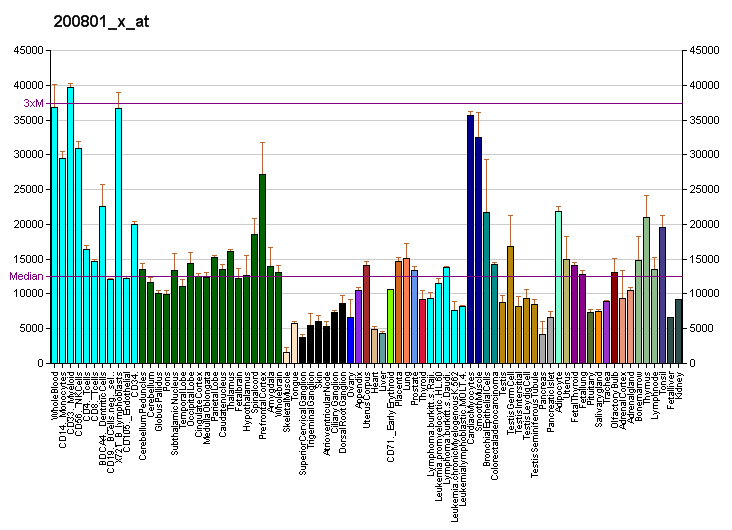
RNA expression pattern
Bgee	Human / Mouse (ortholog); Top expressed in: saphenous vein; urethra; postcentral gyrus; synovial joint; orbitofrontal cortex; mucosa of ileum; Brodmann area 46; nipple; vena cava; olfactory bulb / Top expressed in: human fetus; vas deferens; lateral septal nucleus; Gonadal ridge; mandibular prominence; migratory enteric neural crest cell; maxillary prominence; ventromedial nucleus; abdominal wall; medial ganglionic eminence; More reference expression data
BioGPS	More reference expression data
Gene ontology
Molecular function	RNA polymerase II cis-regulatory region sequence-specific DNA binding; nucleotide binding; nitric-oxide synthase binding; Tat protein binding; structural constituent of cytoskeleton; protein binding; kinesin binding; identical protein binding; nucleosomal DNA binding; ATP binding
Cellular component	cytoplasm; blood microparticle; membrane; focal adhesion; NuA4 histone acetyltransferase complex; plasma membrane; nucleoplasm; cytoplasmic ribonucleoprotein granule; extracellular exosome; cytoskeleton; dense body; cortical cytoskeleton; cytosol; myelin sheath; extracellular space
Biological process	epigenetic maintenance of chromatin in transcription-competent conformation; substantia nigra development; Fc-gamma receptor signaling pathway involved in phagocytosis; ephrin receptor signaling pathway; retina homeostasis; vascular endothelial growth factor receptor signaling pathway; platelet aggregation; cell junction assembly; cytoskeleton organization; protein deubiquitination; membrane organization
Sources:Amigo / QuickGO
Orthologs
Databases	NCBI: entry; OMA: entry
Species	Human	Mouse
Entrez	60	11461
Ensembl	ENSG00000075624	ENSMUSG00000029580
UniProt	P60709	P60710
RefSeq (mRNA)	NM_001101	NM_007393
RefSeq (protein)	NP_001092	NP_031419
Location (UCSC)	Chr 7: 5.53 – 5.56 Mb	Chr 5: 142.89 – 142.89 Mb
PubMed search
- Wikidata
View/Edit Human	View/Edit Mouse

Beta-actin, or Actin beta (HUGO Gene Nomenclature Committee abbreviation ACTB/ACTB) is one of six different actin isoforms which have been identified in humans. This is one of the two nonmuscle cytoskeletal actins. Actins are highly conserved proteins that are involved in cell motility, structure and integrity. Alpha actins are a major constituent of the contractile apparatus.

== Interactions ==
Actin beta has been shown to interact with SPTBN2. In addition, RNA-binding protein Sam68 was found to interact with the mRNA encoding actin beta, which regulates the synaptic formation of the dendritic spines with its cytoskeletal components.

Actin beta has been shown to activate eNOS, thereby increasing NO production. An eight-amino acid motif (326-333) in eNOS has been shown to mediate the interaction between actin and eNOS.

== Clinical relevance ==
Recurrent mutations in this gene have been associated to cases of diffuse large B-cell lymphoma. De novo gain-of-function mutations in this gene is associated with Baraitser-Winter syndrome.

== Applications ==
Actin beta is often used in Western blotting as a loading control, to normalize total protein amounts and check for eventual protein degradation in the samples. Its transcript is also commonly used as a housekeeping gene standard in qPCR. Its molecular weight is approximately 42 kDa.

== See also ==
- Actin
- ACTA1
