= Amido black 10B =

Names
- IUPAC name Sodium 4-amino-5-hydroxy-3-((E)-(4-nitrophenyl)diazenyl)-6-((E)-phenyldiazenyl)naphthalene-2,7-disulfonate
- Other names 4-Amino-5-hydroxy-3-[(4-nitrophenyl)azo]-6-(phenylazo)-2,7-naphthalene disulfonic acid, disodium salt Amidoschwarz; Naphthol blue black Acid Black 1 Acidal Black 10B; Acidal Navy Blue 3BR; Naphthalene Black 10B; Buffalo Black NBR; C.I. 20470

Identifiers
CAS Number	1064-48-8
3D model (JSmol)	Interactive image
ChEBI	CHEBI:86230
ChemSpider	10660833
ECHA InfoCard	100.012.640
EC Number	213-903-1
PubChem CID	9566044
UNII	SZT789770M
CompTox Dashboard (EPA)	DTXSID1024415
- InChI: InChI=1S/C22H16N6O9S2.2Na/c23-19-18-12(11-17(39(35,36)37)21(22(18)29)27-24-13-4-2-1-3-5-13)10-16(38(32,33)34)20(19)26-25-14-6-8-15(9-7-14)28(30)31;;/h1-11,29H,23H2,(H,32,33,34)(H,35,36,37);;/q;2*+1/p-2/b26-25+,27-24+;; Key: AOMZHDJXSYHPKS-DROYEMJCSA-L; InChI=1/C22H16N6O9S2.2Na/c23-19-18-12(11-17(39(35,36)37)21(22(18)29)27-24-13-4-2-1-3-5-13)10-16(38(32,33)34)20(19)26-25-14-6-8-15(9-7-14)28(30)31;;/h1-11,29H,23H2,(H,32,33,34)(H,35,36,37);;/q;2*+1/p-2/b26-25+,27-24+;; Key: AOMZHDJXSYHPKS-NJAWIMKDBA
- SMILES: [Na+].[Na+].O=N(=O)c1ccc(cc1)/N=N/c2c(N)c4c(cc2S([O-])(=O)=O)cc(c(/N=N/c3ccccc3)c4O)S([O-])(=O)=O

Properties
Chemical formula	C_{22}H_{14}N_{6}Na_{2}O_{9}S_{2}
Molar mass	616.49 g·mol^{−1}
Appearance	Dark red to black
Density	1.536 g/cm^{3}
Solubility in water	~ 30 g/L at 20 °C (68 °F)

Hazards
- GHS labelling
Pictograms	(GHS07: Exclamation mark)
Signal word	Warning
NFPA 704 (fire diamond)	2 0 0
- Except where otherwise noted, data are given for materials in their standard state (at 25 °C [77 °F], 100 kPa). verify (what is ?) Infobox references

Amido black 10B is an amino acid staining azo dye used in biochemical research to stain for total protein on transferred membrane blots, such as the western blot. It is also used in criminal investigations to detect blood present with latent fingerprints - it stains the proteins in blood a blue-black color. Amido Black can be either methanol or water based as it readily dissolves in both. With picric acid, in a van Gieson procedure, it can be used to stain collagen and reticulin.

== See also ==
- Western blot normalization
