= SCAND1 =

Protein-coding gene in the species Homo sapiens

Identifiers
- Aliases: SCAND1, RAZ1, SDP1, SCAN domain containing 1
- External IDs: OMIM: 610416; MGI: 1343132; GeneCards: SCAND1

Gene location (Human)
| Chr. | Chromosome 20 (human) |
| Band | 20q11.23 | Start | 35,953,617 bp |
| Band | 20q11.23 | End | 35,959,472 bp |

Gene location (Mouse)
| Chr. | Chromosome 2 (mouse) |
| Band | 2|2 H1 | Start | 156,153,766 bp |
| Band | 2|2 H1 | End | 156,154,667 bp |
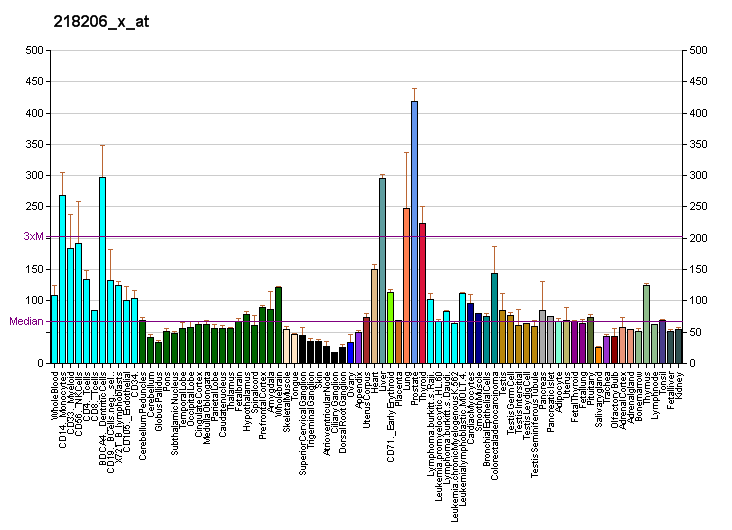
RNA expression pattern
| Bgee | Human / Mouse (ortholog); Top expressed in: mucosa of transverse colon; olfactory zone of nasal mucosa; right adrenal gland; right adrenal cortex; left adrenal cortex; anterior pituitary; right lobe of liver; apex of heart; right uterine tube; gastric mucosa / Top expressed in: granulocyte; tibiofemoral joint; seminiferous tubule; yolk sac; muscle of thigh; medial ganglionic eminence; calvaria; internal carotid artery; right kidney; external carotid artery; More reference expression data |
| BioGPS | More reference expression data |
Gene ontology
| Molecular function | DNA-binding transcription factor activity; transcription coactivator activity; protein binding; identical protein binding; DNA binding |
| Cellular component | nucleus |
| Biological process | regulation of transcription, DNA-templated; positive regulation of nucleic acid-templated transcription |
Sources:Amigo / QuickGO
Orthologs
| Databases | NCBI: entry; OMA: entry |
| Species | Human | Mouse |
| Entrez | 51282 | 19018 |
| Ensembl | ENSG00000171222 | ENSMUSG00000046229 |
| UniProt | P57086 | Q2M4I6 |
| RefSeq (mRNA) | NM_033630; NM_016558; NM_001385710 | NM_020255 |
| RefSeq (protein) | NP_057642; NP_361012 | NP_064651 |
| Location (UCSC) | Chr 20: 35.95 – 35.96 Mb | Chr 2: 156.15 – 156.15 Mb |
| PubMed search |
- Wikidata
| View/Edit Human | View/Edit Mouse |

SCAN domain-containing protein 1 is a protein that in humans is encoded by the SCAND1 gene.

== Function ==
The SCAN domain is a highly conserved, leucine-rich motif of approximately 60 amino acids originally found within a subfamily of zinc finger proteins. This gene belongs to a family of genes that encode an isolated SCAN domain, but no zinc finger motif. Functional studies have established that the SCAN box is a protein interaction domain that mediates both hetero- and homoprotein associations, and maybe involved in regulation of transcriptional activity. Two transcript variants with different 5' UTRs, but encoding the same protein, have been described for this gene.

== Interactions ==
SCAND1 has been shown to interact with MZF1.

== See also ==
- SCAND3
