= GAPDHS =

Enzyme of the glycolysis metabolic pathway

Identifiers
- Aliases: GAPDHS, GAPD2, GAPDH-2, GAPDS, HSD-35, HEL-S-278, glyceraldehyde-3-phosphate dehydrogenase, spermatogenic
- External IDs: OMIM: 609169; MGI: 95653; GeneCards: GAPDHS
Available structures
PDB	Ortholog search: PDBe RCSB
PDB	List of PDB id codes 3H9E, 3PFW, 5C7O, 5C7L
Enzyme activity
EC #	BRENDA	ExPASy	KEGG	MetaCyc
1.2.1.12	↗	↗	↗	↗

Gene location (Human)
Chr.	Chromosome 19 (human)
Band	19q13.12	Start	35,533,455 bp
Band	19q13.12	End	35,545,319 bp

Gene location (Mouse)
Chr.	Chromosome 7 (mouse)
Band	7|7 B1	Start	30,429,200 bp
Band	7|7 B1	End	30,443,106 bp
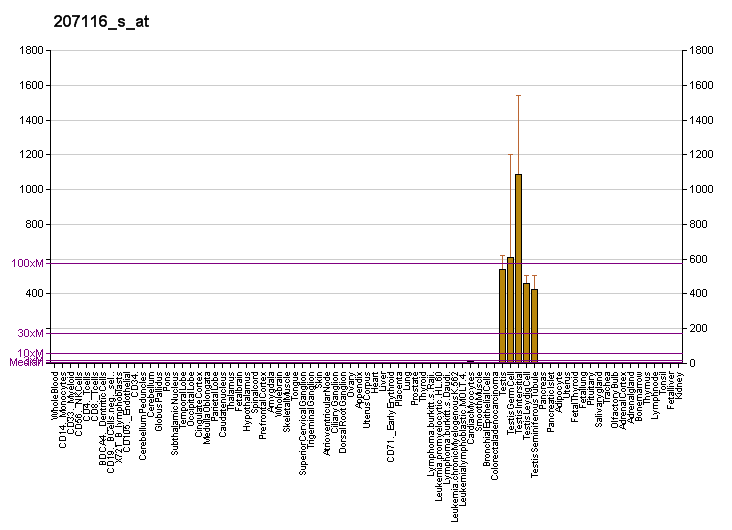

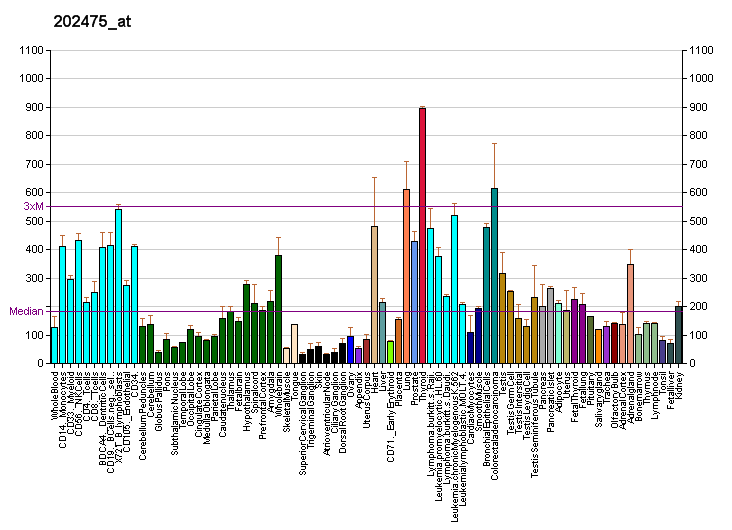
RNA expression pattern
Bgee	Human / Mouse (ortholog); Top expressed in: left testis; right testis; sperm; testicle; skin of leg; skin of abdomen; granulocyte; right uterine tube; tail of epididymis; metanephros / Top expressed in: seminiferous tubule; spermatid; spermatocyte; gastrula; embryo; tail of embryo; neural layer of retina; blastocyst; tibiofemoral joint; muscle of thigh; More reference expression data
BioGPS	More reference expression data
Gene ontology
Molecular function	oxidoreductase activity; NAD binding; oxidoreductase activity, acting on the aldehyde or oxo group of donors, NAD or NADP as acceptor; protein binding; NADP binding; glyceraldehyde-3-phosphate dehydrogenase (NAD+) (phosphorylating) activity
Cellular component	cytoplasm; cytosol; nucleus
Biological process	flagellated sperm motility; gluconeogenesis; glycolytic process; positive regulation of glycolytic process; canonical glycolysis; glucose metabolic process
Sources:Amigo / QuickGO
Orthologs
Databases	NCBI: entry; OMA: entry
Species	Human	Mouse
Entrez	26330	14447
Ensembl	ENSG00000105679	ENSMUSG00000061099
UniProt	O14556	Q64467
RefSeq (mRNA)	NM_014364	NM_001290631; NM_008085
RefSeq (protein)	NP_055179	NP_001277560; NP_032111
Location (UCSC)	Chr 19: 35.53 – 35.55 Mb	Chr 7: 30.43 – 30.44 Mb
PubMed search
- Wikidata
View/Edit Human	View/Edit Mouse

Glyceraldehyde-3-phosphate dehydrogenase, spermatogenic or glyceraldehyde-3-phosphate dehydrogenase, testis-specific is an enzyme that in humans is encoded by the GAPDHS gene.

== Function ==
This gene encodes a protein belonging to the glyceraldehyde-3-phosphate dehydrogenase family of enzymes that play an important role in carbohydrate metabolism. Like its somatic cell counterpart, this sperm-specific enzyme functions in a nicotinamide adenine dinucleotide-dependent manner to remove hydrogen and add phosphate to glyceraldehyde 3-phosphate to form 1,3-diphosphoglycerate. During spermiogenesis, this enzyme may play an important role in regulating the switch between different energy-producing pathways, and it is required for sperm motility and male fertility.

In melanocytic cells GAPDHS gene expression may be regulated by MITF.

== Interactive pathway map ==
Click on genes, proteins and metabolites below to link to respective articles. (Note: The interactive pathway map can be edited at WikiPathways: "GlycolysisGluconeogenesis_WP534".)

Glycolysis and Gluconeogenesis edit
