= Loading control =

A loading control is a protein used as a control in a Western blotting experiment. Typically, loading controls are proteins with high and ubiquitous expression, such as beta-actin or GADPH. They are used to make sure that the protein has been loaded equally across all wells.
