= Glyceraldehyde 3-phosphate dehydrogenase =

Enzyme of the glycolysis metabolic pathway

Glyceraldehyde-3-phosphate dehydrogenase
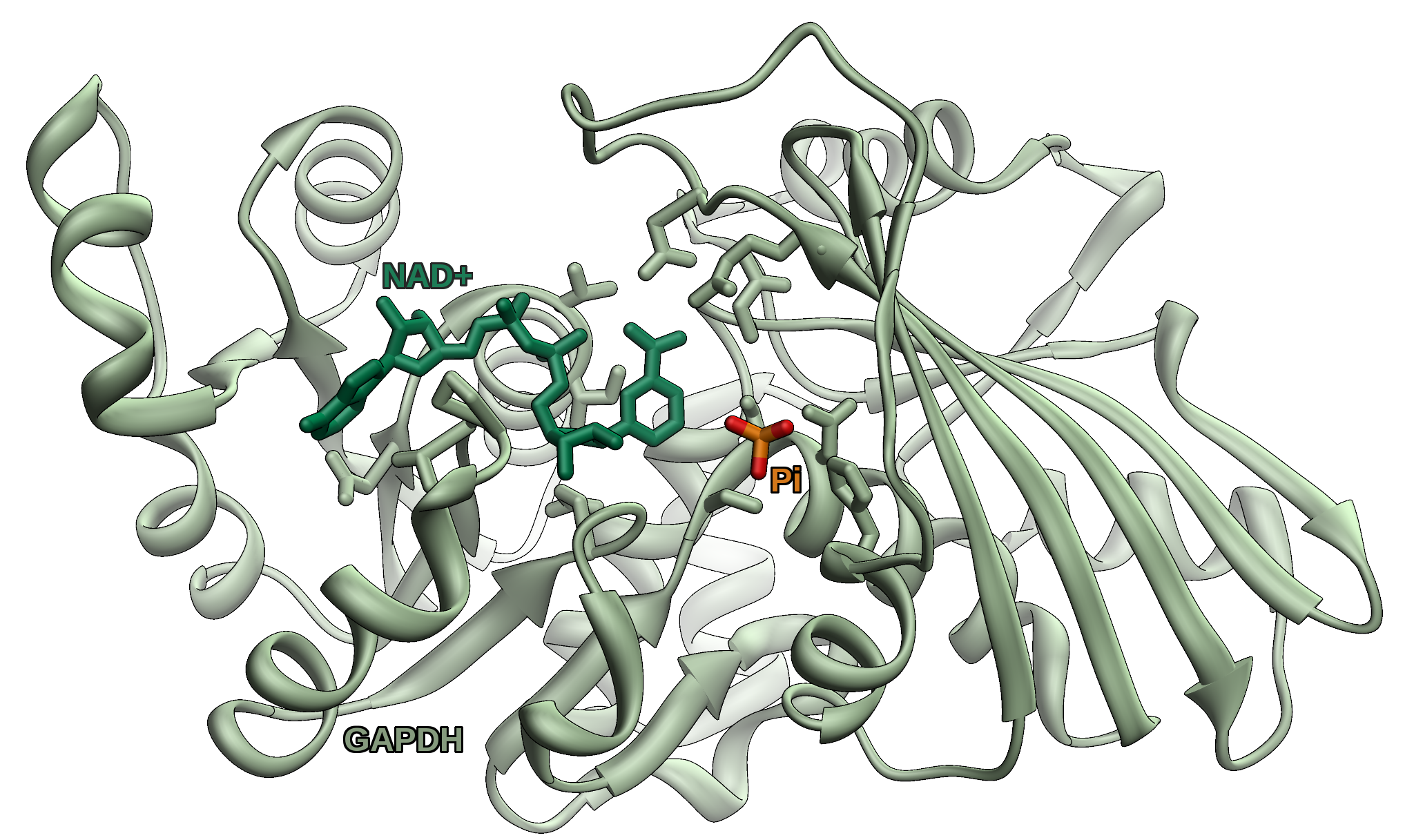

Identifiers
- Aliases: GAPDH, GAPD, G3PD, HEL-S-162eP, glyceraldehyde-3-phosphate dehydrogenase
- External IDs: OMIM: 138400; MGI: 5434255; GeneCards: GAPDH
Available structures
PDB	Ortholog search: PDBe RCSB
PDB	List of PDB id codes 1U8F, 1ZNQ, 3GPD, 4WNC, 4WNI
Enzyme activity
EC #	BRENDA	ExPASy	KEGG	MetaCyc
1.2.1.12	↗	↗	↗	↗

Gene location (Human)
Chr.	Chromosome 12 (human)
Band	12p13.31	Start	6,534,512 bp
Band	12p13.31	End	6,538,374 bp
RNA expression pattern
Bgee	Human / Mouse (ortholog); Top expressed in: frontal pole; pons; paraflocculus of cerebellum; Brodmann area 10; triceps brachii muscle; deltoid muscle; Skeletal muscle tissue of biceps brachii; Brodmann area 46; lateral nuclear group of thalamus; body of tongue / n/a; More reference expression data
BioGPS	n/a
Gene ontology
Molecular function	transferase activity; microtubule binding; NAD binding; oxidoreductase activity, acting on the aldehyde or oxo group of donors, NAD or NADP as acceptor; protein binding; peptidyl-cysteine S-nitrosylase activity; NADP binding; identical protein binding; oxidoreductase activity; glyceraldehyde-3-phosphate dehydrogenase (NAD+) (phosphorylating) activity; aspartic-type endopeptidase inhibitor activity; disordered domain specific binding
Cellular component	vesicle; nuclear membrane; membrane; intracellular membrane-bounded organelle; microtubule cytoskeleton; lipid droplet; plasma membrane; perinuclear region of cytoplasm; GAIT complex; cytoskeleton; extracellular exosome; cytosol; nucleus; extracellular matrix; cytoplasm; ribonucleoprotein complex
Biological process	peptidyl-cysteine S-trans-nitrosylation; neuron apoptotic process; gluconeogenesis; negative regulation of translation; glycolytic process; canonical glycolysis; protein stabilization; cellular response to interferon-gamma; regulation of translation; microtubule cytoskeleton organization; regulation of macroautophagy; apoptotic process; glucose metabolic process; negative regulation of endopeptidase activity; antimicrobial humoral immune response mediated by antimicrobial peptide
Sources:Amigo / QuickGO
Orthologs
Databases	NCBI: entry; OMA: entry
Species	Human	Mouse
Entrez	2597	100042025
Ensembl	ENSG00000111640	n/a
UniProt	P04406	P16858
RefSeq (mRNA)	NM_002046; NM_001256799; NM_001289745; NM_001289746; NM_001357938 NM_001357943; NM_001357944	XM_001476707
RefSeq (protein)	NP_001243728; NP_001276674; NP_001276675; NP_002037; NP_001344872	NP_001276655; NP_032110
Location (UCSC)	Chr 12: 6.53 – 6.54 Mb	n/a
PubMed search
- Wikidata
View/Edit Human	View/Edit Mouse

Glyceraldehyde 3-phosphate dehydrogenase, NAD binding domain
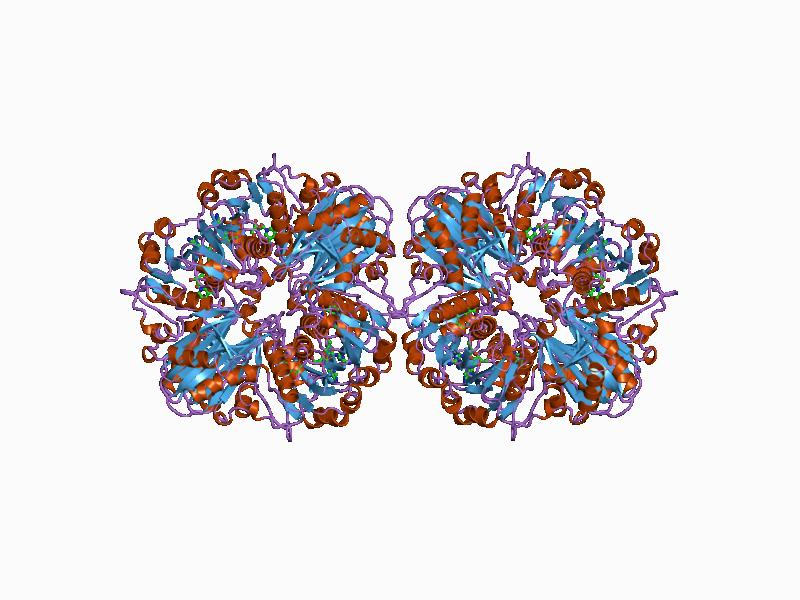
- determinants of enzyme thermostability observed in the molecular structure of thermus aquaticus d-glyceraldehyde-3-phosphate dehydrogenase at 2.5 angstroms resolution

Identifiers
- Symbol: Gp_dh_N
- Pfam: PF00044
- Pfam clan: CL0063
- InterPro: IPR020828
- PROSITE: PDOC00069
- SCOP2: 1gd1 / SCOPe / SUPFAM
Available protein structures:
- PDB: IPR020828 PF00044 (ECOD; PDBsum)
- AlphaFold: IPR020828; PF00044

Glyceraldehyde 3-phosphate dehydrogenase, C-terminal domain
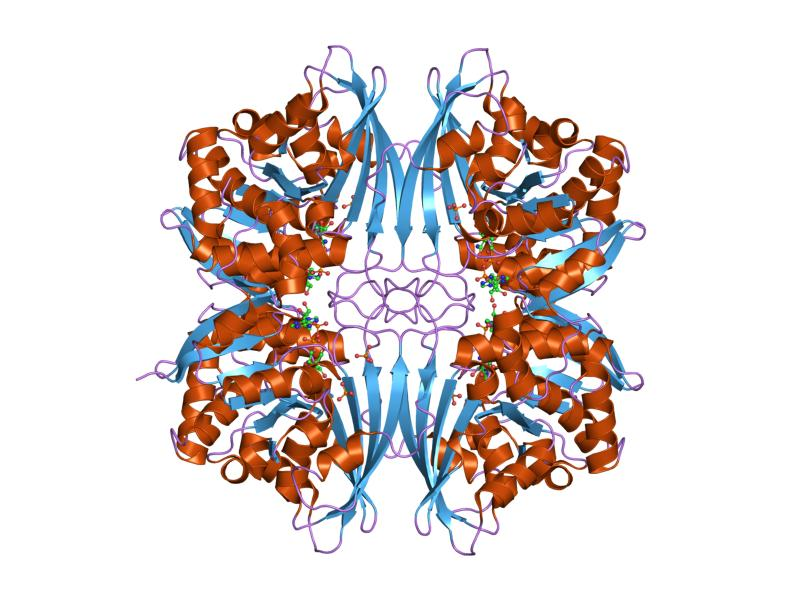
- crystal structure of glyceraldehyde-3-phosphate dehydrogenase from pyrococcus horikoshii ot3

Identifiers
- Symbol: Gp_dh_C
- Pfam: PF02800
- Pfam clan: CL0139
- InterPro: IPR020829
- PROSITE: PDOC00069
- SCOP2: 1gd1 / SCOPe / SUPFAM
Available protein structures:
- PDB: IPR020829 PF02800 (ECOD; PDBsum)
- AlphaFold: IPR020829; PF02800

Glyceraldehyde 3-phosphate dehydrogenase (abbreviated GAPDH) (EC 1.2.1.12) is an enzyme of about 37 kDa that catalyzes the sixth step of glycolysis and thus serves to break down glucose for energy and carbon molecules. In addition to this long established metabolic function, GAPDH has recently been implicated in several non-metabolic processes, including transcription activation, initiation of apoptosis, ER-to-Golgi vesicle shuttling, and fast axonal, or axoplasmic transport. In sperm, a testis-specific isoenzyme GAPDHS is expressed.

== Structure ==
Under normal cellular conditions, cytoplasmic GAPDH exists primarily as a tetramer. This form is composed of four identical 37-kDa subunits containing a single catalytic thiol group each and critical to the enzyme's catalytic function. Nuclear GAPDH has increased isoelectric point (pI) of pH 8.3–8.7. Of note, the cysteine residue C152 in the enzyme's active site is required for the induction of apoptosis by oxidative stress. Notably, post-translational modifications of cytoplasmic GAPDH contribute to its functions outside of glycolysis.

GAPDH is encoded by a single gene that produces a single mRNA transcript with 8 splice variants, though an isoform does exist as a separate gene that is expressed only in spermatozoa.

== Reaction ==
glyceraldehyde 3-phosphate	glyceraldehyde phosphate dehydrogenase		D-glycerate 1,3-bisphosphate
	NAD^{+} +P_{i}	NADH + H^{+}
	NAD^{+} +P_{i}	NADH + H^{+}

Compound C00118 at KEGG Pathway Database. Enzyme 1.2.1.12 at KEGG Pathway Database. Reaction R01063 at KEGG Pathway Database. Compound C00236 at KEGG Pathway Database.

=== Two-step conversion of G3P ===
The first reaction is the oxidation of glyceraldehyde 3-phosphate (G3P) at the position-1 (in the diagram it is shown as the 4th carbon from glycolysis), in which an aldehyde is converted into a carboxylic acid (ΔG°'=-50 kJ/mol (−12kcal/mol)) and NAD+ is simultaneously reduced endergonically to NADH.

The energy released by this highly exergonic oxidation reaction drives the endergonic second reaction (ΔG°'=+50 kJ/mol (+12kcal/mol)), in which a molecule of inorganic phosphate is transferred to the GAP intermediate to form a product with high phosphoryl-transfer potential: 1,3-bisphosphoglycerate (1,3-BPG).

This is an example of phosphorylation coupled to oxidation, and the overall reaction is somewhat endergonic (ΔG°'=+6.3 kJ/mol (+1.5)). Energy coupling here is made possible by GAPDH.

=== Mechanism ===
GAPDH uses covalent catalysis and general base catalysis to decrease the very large activation energy of the second step (phosphorylation) of this reaction.

==== 1: Oxidation ====
First, a cysteine residue in the active site of GAPDH attacks the carbonyl group of G3P, creating a hemithioacetal intermediate (covalent catalysis).

The hemithioacetal is deprotonated by a histidine residue in the enzyme's active site (general base catalysis). Deprotonation encourages the reformation of the carbonyl group in the subsequent thioester intermediate and ejection of a hydride ion.

Next, an adjacent, tightly bound molecule of NAD^{+} accepts the hydride ion, forming NADH while the hemithioacetal is oxidized to a thioester.

This thioester species is much higher in energy (less stable) than the carboxylic acid species that would result if G3P were oxidized in the absence of GAPDH (the carboxylic acid species is so low in energy that the energy barrier for the second step of the reaction (phosphorylation) would be too high, and the reaction, therefore, too slow and unfavorable for a living organism).

==== 2: Phosphorylation ====
NADH leaves the active site and is replaced by another molecule of NAD^{+}, the positive charge of which stabilizes the negatively charged carbonyl oxygen in the transition state of the next and ultimate step. Finally, a molecule of inorganic phosphate attacks the thioester and forms a tetrahedral intermediate, which then collapses to release 1,3-bisphosphoglycerate, and the thiol group of the enzyme's cysteine residue.

=== Regulation ===
This protein may use the morpheein model of allosteric regulation.

== Function ==
=== Metabolic ===
As its name indicates, glyceraldehyde 3-phosphate dehydrogenase (GAPDH) catalyses the conversion of glyceraldehyde 3-phosphate to D-glycerate 1,3-bisphosphate. This is the 6th step in the glycolytic breakdown of glucose, an important pathway of energy and carbon molecule supply which takes place in the cytosol of eukaryotic cells. The conversion occurs in two coupled steps. The first is favourable and allows the second unfavourable step to occur.

=== Adhesion ===
One of the GAPDH moonlighting functions is its role in adhesion and binding to other partners. Bacterial GAPDH from Mycoplasma and Streptococcus and fungal GAPDH from Paracoccidioides brasiliensis are known to bind with the human extracellular matrix component and act in adhesion. GAPDH is found to be surface bound contributing in adhesion and also in competitive exclusion of harmful pathogens. GAPDH from Candida albicans is found to cell-wall associated and binds to Fibronectin and Laminin. GAPDH from probiotics species are known to bind human colonic mucin and ECM, resulting in enhanced colonization of probiotics in the human gut. Patel D. et al., showed that Lactobacillus acidophilus GAPDH binds with mucin, acting in adhesion.

=== Transcription and apoptosis ===
GAPDH can itself activate transcription. The OCA-S transcriptional coactivator complex contains GAPDH and lactate dehydrogenase, two proteins previously only thought to be involved in metabolism. GAPDH moves between the cytosol and the nucleus and may thus link the metabolic state to gene transcription.

In 2005, Hara et al. showed that GAPDH initiates apoptosis. This is not a third function, but can be seen as an activity mediated by GAPDH binding to DNA like in transcription activation, discussed above. The study demonstrated that GAPDH is S-nitrosylated by NO in response to cell stress, which causes it to bind to the protein SIAH1, a ubiquitin ligase. The complex moves into the nucleus where Siah1 targets nuclear proteins for degradation, thus initiating controlled cell shutdown. In subsequent study the group demonstrated that deprenyl, which has been used clinically to treat Parkinson's disease, strongly reduces the apoptotic action of GAPDH by preventing its S-nitrosylation and might thus be used as a drug.

=== Metabolic switch ===
GAPDH acts as a reversible metabolic switch under oxidative stress. When cells are exposed to oxidants, they need excessive amounts of the antioxidant cofactor NADPH. In the cytosol, NADPH is reduced from NADP+ by several enzymes, three of them catalyze the first steps of the pentose phosphate pathway. Oxidant-treatments cause an inactivation of GAPDH. This inactivation re-routes temporally the metabolic flux from glycolysis to the pentose phosphate pathway, allowing the cell to generate more NADPH. Under stress conditions, NADPH is needed by some antioxidant-systems including glutaredoxin and thioredoxin as well as being essential for the recycling of gluthathione.

=== ER-to-Golgi transport ===
GAPDH also appears to be involved in the vesicle transport from the endoplasmic reticulum (ER) to the Golgi apparatus which is part of shipping route for secreted proteins. It was found that GAPDH is recruited by rab2 to the vesicular-tubular clusters of the ER where it helps to form COP 1 vesicles. GAPDH is activated via tyrosine phosphorylation by Src.

=== Additional functions ===
GAPDH, like many other enzymes, has multiple functions. In addition to catalysing the 6th step of glycolysis, recent evidence implicates GAPDH in other cellular processes. GAPDH has been described to exhibit higher order multifunctionality in the context of maintaining cellular iron homeostasis, specifically as a chaperone protein for labile heme within cells. This came as a surprise to researchers but it makes evolutionary sense to re-use and adapt existing proteins instead of evolving a novel protein from scratch.

== Use as loading control ==
Because the GAPDH gene is often stably and constitutively expressed at high levels in most tissues and cells, it is considered a housekeeping gene. For this reason, GAPDH is commonly used by biological researchers as a loading control for western blot and as a control for qPCR. However, researchers have reported different regulation of GAPDH under specific conditions. For example, the transcription factor MZF-1 has been shown to regulate the GAPDH gene. Hypoxia also strongly upregulates GAPDH. Therefore, the use of GAPDH as loading control has to be considered carefully.

== Cellular distribution ==
All steps of glycolysis take place in the cytosol and so does the reaction catalysed by GAPDH. In red blood cells, GAPDH and several other glycolytic enzymes assemble in complexes on the inside of the cell membrane. The process appears to be regulated by phosphorylation and oxygenation. Bringing several glycolytic enzymes close to each other is expected to greatly increase the overall speed of glucose breakdown. Recent studies have also revealed that GAPDH is expressed in an iron dependent fashion on the exterior of the cell membrane a where it plays a role in maintenance of cellular iron homeostasis.

== Clinical significance ==
=== Cancer ===
GAPDH is overexpressed in multiple human cancers, such as cutaneous melanoma, and its expression is positively correlated with tumor progression. Its glycolytic and antiapoptotic functions contribute to proliferation and protection of tumor cells, promoting tumorigenesis. Notably, GAPDH protects against telomere shortening induced by chemotherapeutic drugs that stimulate the sphingolipid ceramide. Meanwhile, conditions like oxidative stress impair GAPDH function, leading to cellular aging and death. Moreover, depletion of GAPDH has managed to induce senescence in tumor cells, thus presenting a novel therapeutic strategy for controlling tumor growth.

=== Neurodegeneration ===
GAPDH has been implicated in several neurodegenerative diseases and disorders, largely through interactions with other proteins specific to that disease or disorder. These interactions may affect not only energy metabolism but also other GAPDH functions. For example, GAPDH interactions with beta-amyloid precursor protein (betaAPP) could interfere with its function regarding the cytoskeleton or membrane transport, while interactions with huntingtin could interfere with its function regarding apoptosis, nuclear tRNA transport, DNA replication, and DNA repair. In addition, nuclear translocation of GAPDH has been reported in Parkinson's disease (PD), and several anti-apoptotic PD drugs, such as rasagiline, function by preventing the nuclear translocation of GAPDH. It is proposed that hypometabolism may be one contributor to PD, but the exact mechanisms underlying GAPDH involvement in neurodegenerative disease remains to be clarified. The SNP rs3741916 in the 5' UTR of the GAPDH gene may be associated with late onset Alzheimer's disease.

== Interactions ==
=== Protein binding partners ===
GAPDH participates in a number of biological functions through its protein–protein interactions with:

- tubulin to facilitate microtubule bundling;
- actin to facilitate actin polymerization;
- VDAC1 to induce mitochondrial membrane permeabilization (MMP) and apoptosis;
- Inositol 1,4,5-trisphosphate receptor to regulate intracellular Ca2+ signaling;
- Oct-1 to form the coactivator complex OCA-S, which is required for histone H2B synthesis during S phase of the cell cycle;
- p22 to aid microtubule organization;
- Rab2 to facilitate endoplasmic reticulum (ER)–golgi transport;
- Transferrin on the surface of diverse cells and in extracellular fluid;
- Lactate dehydrogenase;
- Lactoferrin;
- Apurinic/apyrimidinic endonuclease (APE1), thus converting oxidized APE1 to its reduced form, to restart its endonuclease activity;
- Promyelocytic leukaemia protein (PML) in an RNA-dependent fashion;
- Rheb to sequester the GTPase during low glucose conditions;
- Siah1 to form a complex that translocates to the nucleus, where it ubiquitinates and degrades nuclear proteins during nitrosative stress conditions;
- GAPDH's competitor of Siah protein enhances life (GOSPEL) to block GAPDH interaction with Siah1 and, thus, cell death in response to oxidative stress;
- p300/CREB binding protein (CBP), which acetylates GAPDH and, in turn, enhances the acetylation of additional apoptotic targets;
- skeletal muscle-specific Ca2+/calmodulin-dependent protein kinase;
- Akt;
- Beta-amyloid precursor protein (betaAPP);
- Huntingtin.
- GAPDH can self-associate into homotypic oligomers/aggregates

=== Nucleic acid binding partners ===
GAPDH binds to single-stranded RNA and DNA and a number of nucleic acid binding partners have been identified:

- tRNA,
- Hepatitis A viral RNA,
- Hepatitis B viral RNA,
- Hepatitis C viral RNA,
- HPIV3,
- lymphokine mRNA,
- IFN-γ mRNA,
- Japanese encephalitis virus mRNA, and
- telomeric DNA.

=== Inhibitors ===
- Desmethylselegiline
- Koningic acid
- Rasagiline
- Selegiline

== Interactive pathway map ==
Click on genes, proteins and metabolites below to link to respective articles. (Note: The interactive pathway map can be edited at WikiPathways: "GlycolysisGluconeogenesis_WP534".)

Glycolysis and Gluconeogenesis edit
