= Koningic acid =

Names
- Preferred IUPAC name (2′S,5aS,6R,9aS)-1-Oxo-6-(propan-2-yl)-1,5a,6,7,8,9a-hexahydro-3H-spiro[[2]benzoxepine-9,2′-oxirane]-4-carboxylic acid
- Other names (+)-Heptelidic acid

Identifiers
CAS Number	57710-57-3
3D model (JSmol)	Interactive image
ChEBI	CHEBI:214314
ChEMBL	ChEMBL3585922
ChemSpider	9121060
PubChem CID	10945834
UNII	6H8EDV2NKQ
CompTox Dashboard (EPA)	DTXSID901105608
- InChI: InChI=1S/C15H20O5/c1-8(2)10-3-4-15(7-20-15)12-11(10)5-9(13(16)17)6-19-14(12)18/h5,8,10-12H,3-4,6-7H2,1-2H3,(H,16,17)/t10-,11-,12-,15-/m1/s1 Key: JESMSCGUTIEROV-RTWAVKEYSA-N
- SMILES: CC(C)[C@H]1CC[C@@]2(CO2)[C@@H]3[C@@H]1C=C(COC3=O)C(=O)O

Properties
Chemical formula	C_{15}H_{20}O_{5}
Molar mass	280.320 g·mol^{−1}
- Except where otherwise noted, data are given for materials in their standard state (at 25 °C [77 °F], 100 kPa). Infobox references

Koningic acid (KA, also known as heptelidic acid) is a potent, selective, irreversible GAPDH inhibitor. It is also a DNA polymerase inhibitor. The koningic acid molecule, produced by fungi that consume sweet potatoes, has been shown to curb the excessive glucose consumption in tumors exhibiting the Warburg effect and leaving healthy cells alone.
