= 5-Sulfosalicylic acid =

Sulfosalicylic acid

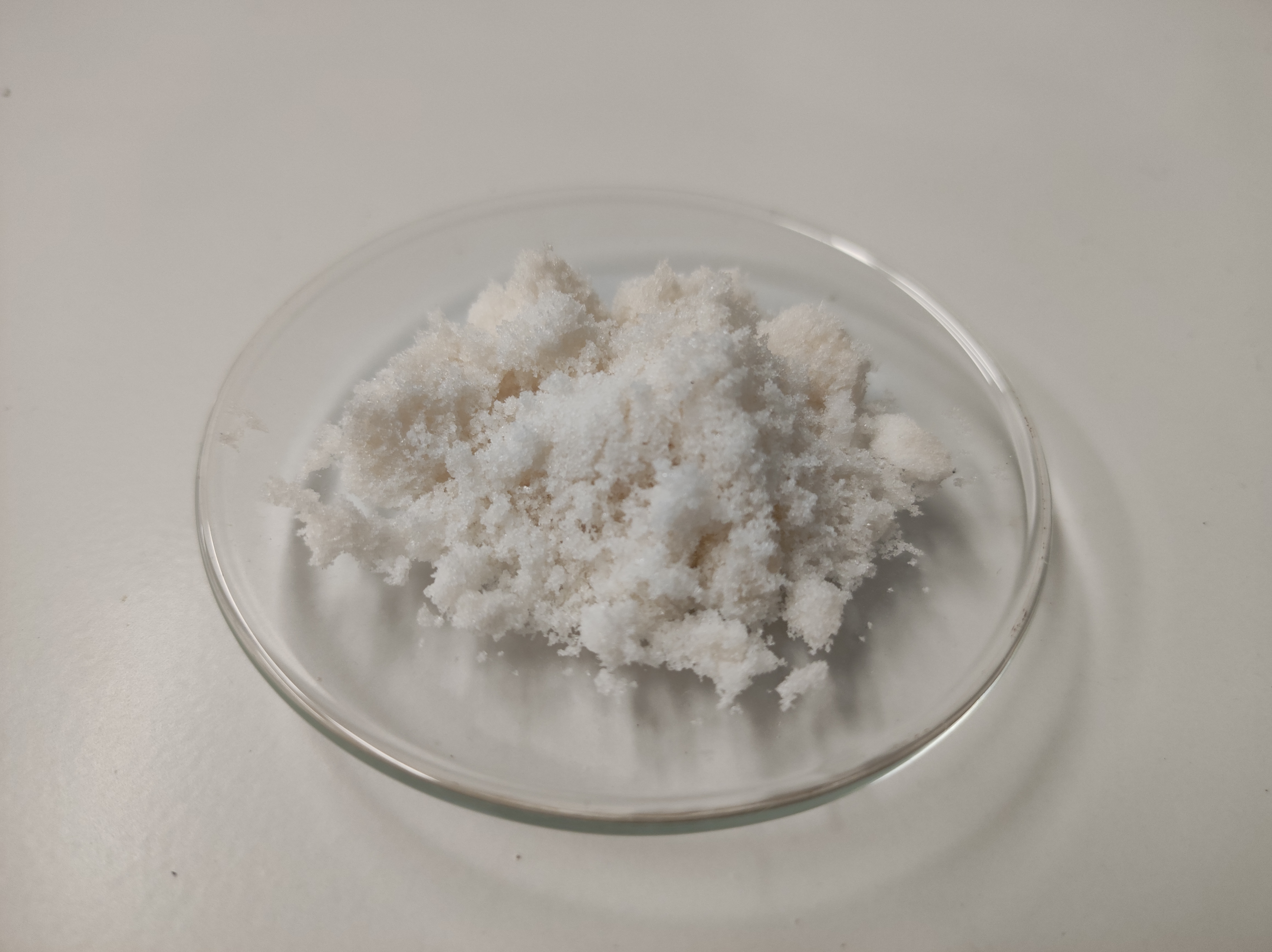

Names
- IUPAC name 2-Hydroxy-5-sulfobenzoic acid

Identifiers
| CAS Number | 97-05-2 |
| 3D model (JSmol) | Interactive image |
| ChEBI | CHEBI:68555 |
| ChEMBL | ChEMBL229241 |
| ChemSpider | 7046 |
| ECHA InfoCard | 100.002.324 |
| EC Number | 202-555-6 |
| KEGG | C16199 |
| PubChem CID | 7322 |
| UNII | L8XED79U3U |
| CompTox Dashboard (EPA) | DTXSID7059145 |
- InChI: InChI=1S/C7H6O6S/c8-6-2-1-4(14(11,12)13)3-5(6)7(9)10/h1-3,8H,(H,9,10)(H,11,12,13) Key: YCPXWRQRBFJBPZ-UHFFFAOYSA-N; InChI=1/C7H6O6S/c8-6-2-1-4(14(11,12)13)3-5(6)7(9)10/h1-3,8H,(H,9,10)(H,11,12,13) Key: YCPXWRQRBFJBPZ-UHFFFAOYAD
- SMILES: O=C(O)c1cc(ccc1O)S(=O)(=O)O

Properties
| Chemical formula | C_{7}H_{6}O_{6}S |
| Molar mass | 218.185 g/mol |
| Melting point | 120 °C (248 °F; 393 K) |
- Except where otherwise noted, data are given for materials in their standard state (at 25 °C [77 °F], 100 kPa). verify (what is ?) Infobox references

Sulfosalicylic acid is used in urine tests to determine urine protein content. The chemical causes the precipitation of dissolved proteins, which is measured from the degree of turbidity.

It is also used for integral colour anodizing.

With water it is used as a shuttle solution for the CAS assay to test for siderophore.

== See also ==
- Salicylic acid
