= Coomassie brilliant blue =

Coomassie Brilliant Blue R-250

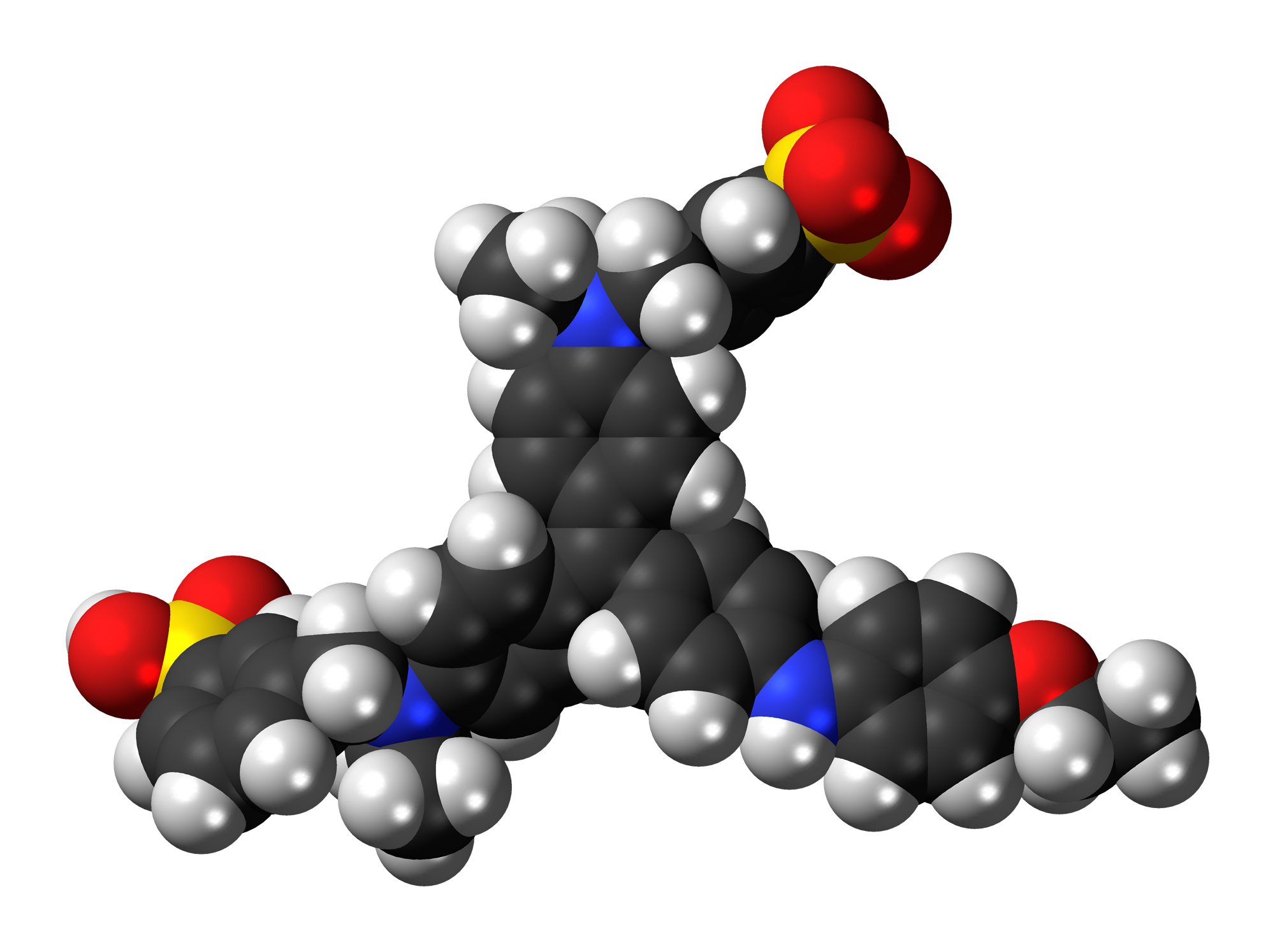

Names
- Other names C.I. 42660, C.I. Acid Blue 83; Brilliant indocyanine 6B, Brillantindocyanin 6B; Brilliant Cyanine 6B, Serva Blue R

Identifiers
CAS Number	6104-59-2
3D model (JSmol)	Interactive image
ChEMBL	ChEMBL4279842
ChemSpider	acid: 21172997
ECHA InfoCard	100.025.509
EC Number	228-060-5
PubChem CID	61365
UNII	TKL1K0PT9A
CompTox Dashboard (EPA)	DTXSID80910613
- InChI: InChI=1S/C45H45N3O7S2.Na/c1-4-47(31-33-9-7-11-43(29-33)56(49,50)51)40-23-15-36(16-24-40)45(35-13-19-38(20-14-35)46-39-21-27-42(28-22-39)55-6-3)37-17-25-41(26-18-37)48(5-2)32-34-10-8-12-44(30-34)57(52,53)54;/h7-30H,4-6,31-32H2,1-3H3,(H2,49,50,51,52,53,54);/q;+1/p-1 Key: NKLPQNGYXWVELD-UHFFFAOYSA-M
- SMILES: CCN(CC1=CC(=CC=C1)S(=O)(=O)O)C2=CC=C(C=C2)C(=C3C=CC(=[N+](CC)CC4=CC(=CC=C4)S(=O)(=O)[O-])C=C3)C5=CC=C(C=C5)NC6=CC=C(C=C6)OCC.[Na+]

Properties
Chemical formula	C_{45}H_{44}N_{3}NaO_{7}S_{2} (Sodium salt)
Molar mass	825.97 g/mol
Solubility in water	Insoluble in cold, slightly soluble in hot (bright red blue)
Solubility in ethanol	Slightly soluble
- Except where otherwise noted, data are given for materials in their standard state (at 25 °C [77 °F], 100 kPa). verify (what is ?) Infobox references

Coomassie brilliant blue G-250

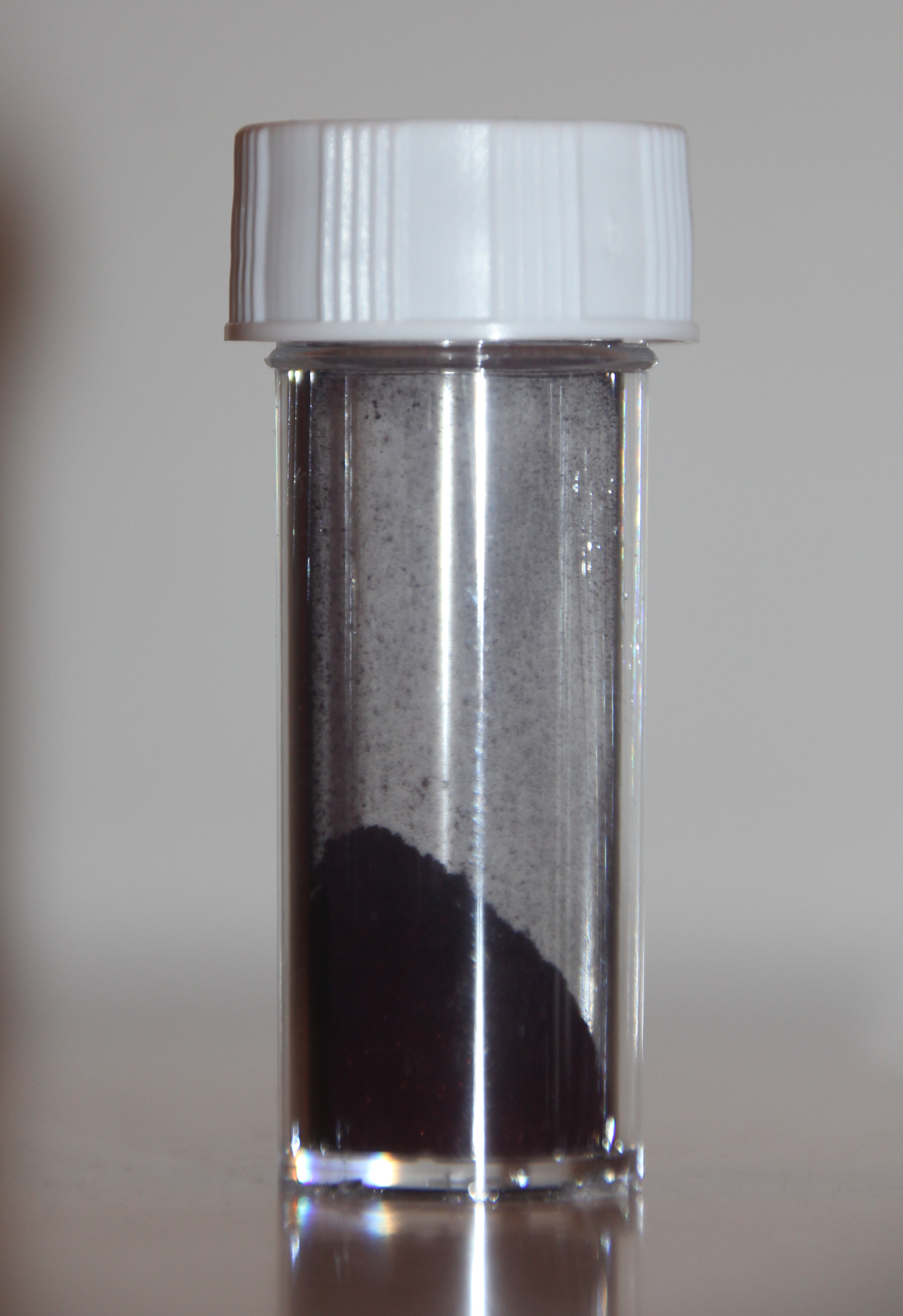
Solid Coomassie brilliant blue G
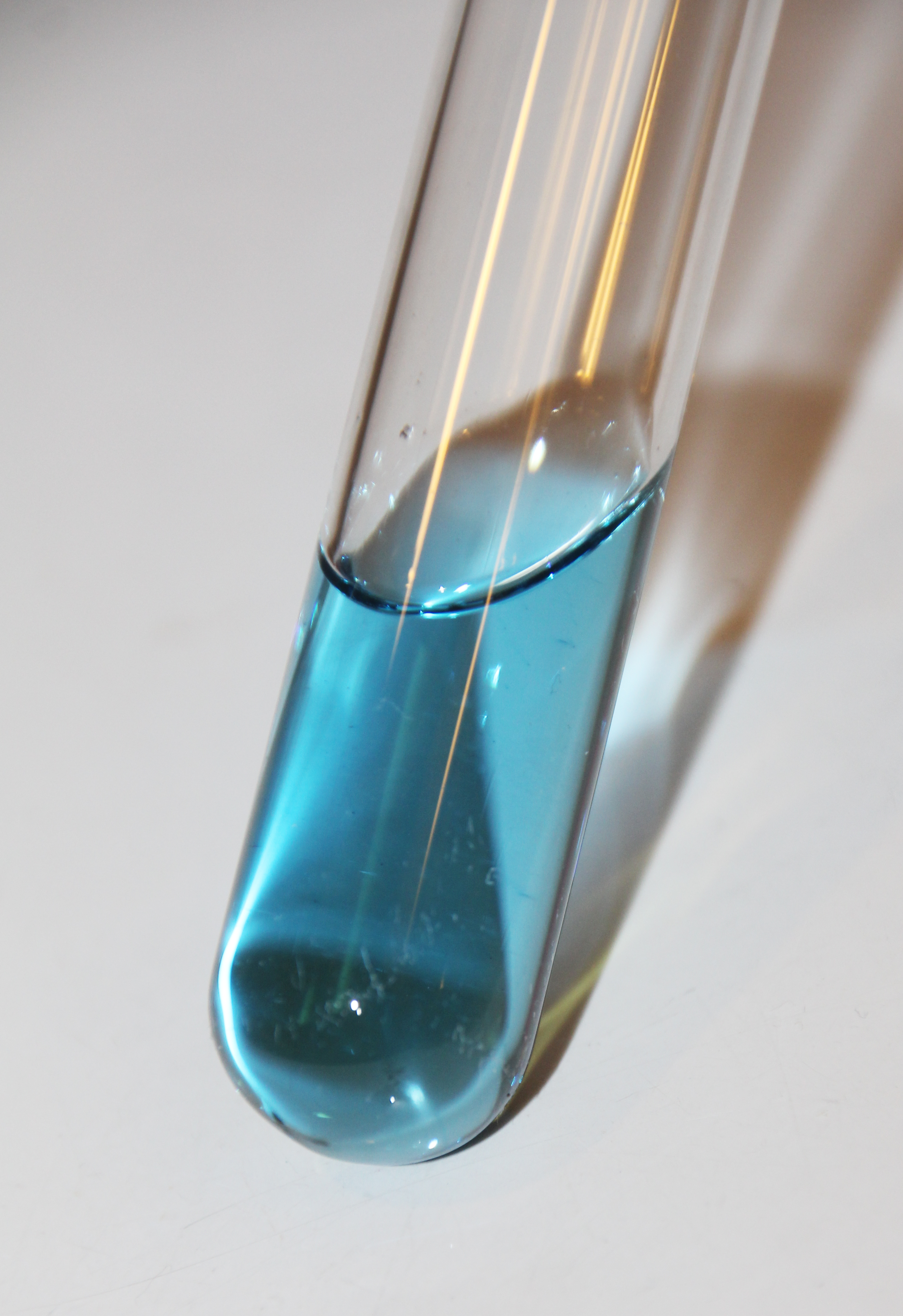
Brilliant blue G in isopropanol solution

Names
- Other names C.I. 42655, C.I. Acid Blue 90; Brilliant indocyanine G, Brillantindocyanin G Xylene Brilliant Cyanine G, Serva Blue G

Identifiers
CAS Number	6104-58-1
3D model (JSmol)	Interactive image
ECHA InfoCard	100.025.509
KEGG	D10799
PubChem CID	6324599
CompTox Dashboard (EPA)	DTXSID80910613
- SMILES: CCN(CC1=CC(=CC=C1)S(=O)(=O)O)C2=CC(=C(C=C2)/C(=C\3/C=CC(=[N+](CC)CC4=CC(=CC=C4)S(=O)(=O)O)C=C3C)/C5=CC=C(C=C5)NC6=CC=C(C=C6)OCC)C

Properties
Chemical formula	C_{47}H_{50}N_{3}NaO_{7}S_{2} (Sodium salt)
Molar mass	856.03 g/mol
Solubility in water	Slightly soluble in cold, soluble in hot (bright blue)
Solubility in ethanol	Soluble

Pharmacology
Legal status	CA: ℞-only
- Except where otherwise noted, data are given for materials in their standard state (at 25 °C [77 °F], 100 kPa). Infobox references

Coomassie brilliant blue is the name of two similar triphenylmethane dyes that were developed for use in the textile industry but are now commonly used for staining proteins in analytical biochemistry. Coomassie brilliant blue G-250 differs from Coomassie brilliant blue R-250 by the addition of two methyl groups. The name "Coomassie" is a registered trademark of Imperial Chemical Industries.

== Name and discovery ==
The name Coomassie was adopted at the end of the 19th century as a trade name by the Blackley-based dye manufacturer Levinstein Ltd, in marketing a range of acid wool dyes. In 1896 during the Fourth Anglo–Ashanti War, British forces had occupied the town of Coomassie (modern-day Kumasi in Ghana). In 1918 Levinstein Ltd became part of British Dyestuffs, which in 1926 became part of Imperial Chemical Industries. Although ICI still owns the Coomassie trademark, the company no longer manufactures the dyes.

The blue disulfonated triphenylmethane dyes were first produced in 1913 by Max Weiler, who was based in Elberfeld, Germany. Various patents were subsequently taken out on the organic synthesis.

Papers published in biochemistry journals frequently refer to these dyes simply as "Coomassie" without specifying which dye was used. In fact, the Colour Index lists over 40 dyes with "Coomassie" in their name. There are also other Coomassie "blue" dyes. For example, the Merck Index (10th edition) lists Coomassie Blue RL (Acid Blue 92, C.I. 13390), which has a completely different structure.

== Dye colour ==
The suffix "R" in the name of Coomassie brilliant blue R-250 is an abbreviation for "red" as the blue colour of the dye has a slight reddish tint. For the "G" variant the blue colour has a more greenish tint. The "250" originally denoted the purity of the dye.

The colour of the two dyes depends on the acidity of the solution. The "G" form of the dye has been studied in detail. At a pH of less than 0 the dye has a red colour with an absorption maximum at a wavelength of 465 nm. At a pH of around 1 the dye is green with an absorption maximum at 620 nm while above pH 2 the dye is bright blue with a maximum at 595 nm. At pH 7 the dye has an extinction coefficient of 43,000 M^{−1} cm^{−1}.

The different colours are a result of the different charged states of the dye molecule. In the red form, all three nitrogen atoms carry a positive charge. The two sulfonic acid groups have extremely low pK_{a} and will normally be negatively charged, thus at a pH of around zero the dye will be a cation with an overall charge of +1. The green colour corresponds to a form of the dye with no net overall charge. In neutral media (pH 7), only the nitrogen atom of the diphenylamine moiety carries a positive charge and the blue dye molecule is an anion with an overall charge of −1. The pK_{a} values for the losses of the two protons are 1.15 and 1.82, respectively. The final proton is lost under alkaline conditions and the dye becomes pink (pK_{a} 12.4).

The dye interacts electrostatically but noncovalently with the amino and carboxyl groups of proteins. The dye molecules bind to proteins, including those in wool (keratin), to form a protein–dye complex. The formation of the complex stabilises the negatively charged anionic form of the dye, producing the blue colour, even under acid conditions when most of the molecules in solution are in the cationic form. This is the basis of the Bradford assay, which quantifies protein by Coomassie brilliant blue dye binding. The binding of the dye to a protein causes a shift in the absorbance maximum of the dye from 465 to 595 nm. The increase of absorption at 595 nm is monitored to determine protein concentration.

The dye also forms a complex with the anionic detergent sodium dodecylsulfate (SDS). The formation of this complex stabilizes the neutral, green form of the dye. This effect can interfere with the estimation of protein concentration using the Bradford assay. It is also likely that the anionic detergent competes with the dye for binding to the protein.

== Applications in biochemistry ==
Coomassie brilliant blue R-250 was first used to visualise proteins in 1963 by Fazekas de St. Groth and colleagues. Protein samples were separated electrophoretically on a cellulose acetate sheet. The sheet was then soaked in sulfosalicylic acid to fix the protein bands and transferred to a solution of the dye.

Two years later in 1965 Meyer and Lambert used Coomassie brilliant blue R-250 to stain protein samples after electrophoretic separation in a polyacrylamide gel. They soaked the gel in a dye solution containing methanol, acetic acid and water. As the dye stained the polyacrylamide gel as well as the protein, in order to visualise the protein bands they needed to destain the gel, which they did electrophoretically. Subsequent publications reported that polyacrylamide gels could be successfully destained using an acetic acid solution.

The first report of the use of the G form of the dye to visualise protein bands in polyacrylamide gels came in 1967, where the dye was dissolved in an acetic acid solution containing methanol. It was subsequently discovered that the protein bands could be stained without staining the polyacrylamide by using a colloid of the G form of the dye in a trichloroacetic acid solution containing no methanol. With this procedure it was no longer necessary to destain the gel. Modern formulations typically use a colloid of the G form of dye in a solution containing phosphoric acid, ethanol (or methanol) and ammonium sulfate (or aluminium sulfate).

The Bradford assay uses the spectral properties of Coomassie brilliant blue G-250 to estimate the amount of protein in a solution. A protein sample is added to a solution of the dye in phosphoric acid and ethanol. Under the acid conditions the dye is normally a brownish colour but on binding to the protein the blue form of the dye is produced. The optical absorbance of the solution is measured at a wavelength of 595 nm. The dye is noted for its high level of sensitivity: 5 μg of protein can be detected. However, among the disadvantages of the method is its variability of color development with different proteins: the absorbance change per unit mass of proteins varies with the type of the protein.

On binding to a protein, the negatively charged Coomassie brilliant blue G-250 dye molecule will give an overall negative charge to the protein. This property can be used to separate proteins or protein complexes using polyacrylamide gel electrophoresis under non-denaturing conditions in a technique called blue native PAGE. The mobility of the complex in the polyacrylamide gel will depend on both the size of the protein complex (i.e., the molecular weight) and the amount of dye bound to the protein.

Coomassie blue staining can also be used as a loading control staining method in western blot analysis. It is applied as an anionic pre-antibody stain.

== Medical uses ==
In 2009, brilliant blue G was used in scientific experiments to treat spinal injuries in laboratory rats. It acts by reducing the body's natural swelling response, which can cause neurons in the area to die of metabolic stress. Testing on the rats proved effective. In comparison to the rats that had not received the dye, the rats that were treated with the dye performed better on motion tests. It is unknown whether this treatment can be used effectively in humans. The animal experiments administered the dye within 15 minutes of injury, but to be effective in a real-life setting, where it may take time for a patient to reach the emergency room, the treatment needs to be effective even when administered up to two hours after injury. The only reported side effect was that the rats temporarily turned blue.

Under the trade names ILM Blue and Brilliant Peel, brilliant blue G is used as a stain to assist surgeons in retinal surgery. In December 2019, brilliant blue G (under the trade name TissueBlue, DORC International, Netherlands) was approved for use in humans in the United States.

Tissueblue was approved for medical use in Canada in January 2021.

== Application in forensic science ==
The ability of the Coomassie dye to target amino acids with aromatic groups (phenylalanine, tyrosine, tryptophan) and basic side chains (lysine, arginine and histidine) allows the Bradford assay to be used for fingerprint analysis. The assay was successfully used to identify the biological sex of the fingerprint. Female samples were shown to have a higher absorbance than male samples when tested at similar wavelengths. This provides a simpler method for fingerprint analysis by reducing the number of amino acids needing to be analyzed from 23 to 6 and requires little to no assay preparation, in contrast to the ninhydrin chemical assay, which requires assay preparation such as heating and enzyme cascade.
