= Eastern blot =

Analytical technique

The eastern blot, or eastern blotting, is a name that has been applied to a number of biochemical techniques used to analyze protein post-translational modifications including the addition of lipids, phosphates, and glycoconjugates. Most techniques that have been described by the term "eastern blot(ting)" use phosphoprotein blotted from sodium dodecyl sulfate–polyacrylamide gel electrophoresis (SDS-PAGE) gel on to a polyvinylidene fluoride or nitrocellulose membrane. Transferred proteins are analyzed for post-translational modifications using probes that may detect lipids, carbohydrate, phosphorylation or any other protein modification. Eastern blotting should be used to refer to methods that detect their targets through specific interaction of the post-translational modifications and the probe, distinguishing them from a standard far-western blot. In principle, eastern blotting is similar to lectin blotting (i.e., detection of carbohydrate epitopes on proteins or lipids).

== History and multiple definitions ==
Definition of the term eastern blot is somewhat confused due to multiple sets of authors dubbing a new method as eastern blot, or a derivative thereof. All of the definitions are a derivative of the technique of western blot developed by Towbin in 1979. The current definitions are summarized below in order of the first use of the name; however, all are based on some earlier works. In some cases, the technique had been in practice for some time before the introduction of the term.

- (1982) The term eastern blotting was specifically rejected by two separate groups: Reinhart and Malamud referred to a protein blot of a native gel as a native blot; Peferoen et al., opted to refer to their method of drawing sodium dodecyl sulfate-gel separated proteins onto nitrocellulose using a vacuum as Vacuum blotting.
- (1984) Middle-eastern blotting has been described as a blot of polyA RNA (resolved by agarose) which is then immobilized. The immobilized RNA is then probed using DNA.
- (1996) Eastern-western blot was first used by Bogdanov et al. The method involved blotting of phospholipids on polyvinylidene fluoride or nitrocellulose membrane prior to transfer of proteins onto the same nitrocellulose membrane by conventional western blotting and probing with conformation specific antibodies. This method is based on earlier work by Taki et al. in 1994, which they originally dubbed TLC blotting, and was based on a similar method introduced by Towbin in 1984.
- (2000) Far-eastern blotting seems to have been first named in 2000 by Ishikawa & Taki. The method is described more fully in the article on far-eastern blot, but is based on antibody or lectin staining of lipids transferred to polyvinylidene fluoride membranes.
- (2001) Eastern blotting was described as a technique for detecting glycoconjugates generated by blotting BSA onto polyvinylidene fluoride membranes, followed by periodate treatment. The oxidized protein is then treated with a complex mixture, generating a new conjugate on the membrane. The membrane is then probed with antibodies for epitopes of interest. This method has also been discussed in later work by the same group. The method is essentially far-eastern blot.
- (2002) Eastern blot has also been used to describe an immunoblot performed on proteins blotted to a polyvinylidene fluoride membrane from a PAGE gel run with opposite polarity. Since this is essentially a western blot, the charge reversal was used to dub this method an eastern blot.
- (2005) Eastern blot has been used to describe a blot of proteins on polyvinylidene fluoride membrane where the probe is an aptamer rather than an antibody. This could be seen as similar to a Southern blot, however the interaction is between a DNA molecule (the aptamer) and a protein, rather than two DNA molecules. The method is similar to southwestern blot.
- (2006) Eastern blotting has been used to refer to the detection of fusion proteins through complementation. The name is based on the use of an enzyme activator (EA) as part of the detection.
- (2009) Eastern blotting has most recently been re-dubbed by Thomas et al. as a technique which probes proteins blotted to polyvinylidene fluoride membrane with lectins, cholera toxin and chemical stains to detect glycosylated, lipoylated or phosphorylated proteins. These authors distinguish the method from the far-eastern blot named by Taki et al. in that they use lectin probes and other staining reagents.
- (2009) Eastern blot has been used to describe a blot of proteins on nitrocellulose membrane where the probe is an aptamer rather than an antibody. The method is similar to southwestern blot.
- (2011) A recent study used the term eastern blotting to describe detection of glycoproteins with lectins such as concanavalin A

There is clearly no single accepted definition of the term. A 2007 highlight article has interviewed Ed Southern, originator of the Southern blot, regarding a renaming of eastern blotting from Tanaka et al. The article likens the eastern blot to "fairies, unicorns, and a free lunch" and states that eastern blots "don't exist." The eastern blot is mentioned in an immunology textbook which compares the common blotting methods (Southern, northern and western), and states that "the eastern blot, however, exists only in test questions."

The principles used for eastern blotting to detect glycans can be traced back to the use of lectins to detect protein glycosylation. The earliest example for this mode of detection is Tanner and Anstee in 1976, where lectins were used to detect glycosylated proteins isolated from human erythrocytes. The specific detection of glycosylation through blotting is usually referred to as lectin blotting. A summary of more recent improvements of the protocol has been provided by H. Freeze.

== Applications ==
One application of the technique includes detection of protein modifications in two bacterial species Ehrlichia – E. muris and IOE. Cholera toxin B subunit (which binds to gangliosides), concanavalin A (which detects mannose-containing glycans) and nitrophospho-molybdate-methyl green (which detects phosphoproteins) were used to detect protein modifications. The technique showed that the antigenic proteins of the non-virulent E.muris is more post-translationally modified than the highly virulent IOE.

== Significance ==
Most proteins that are translated from mRNA undergo modifications before becoming functional in cells. These modifications are collectively known as post-translational modifications. The nascent or folded proteins, which are stable under physiological conditions, are then subjected to a battery of specific enzyme-catalyzed modifications on the side chains or backbones.

Post-translational modification of proteins can include acetylation, acylation (myristoylation, palmitoylation), alkylation, arginylation, ADP-ribosylation, biotinylation, formylation, geranylgeranylation, glutamylation, glycosylation, glycylation, hydroxylation, isoprenylation, lactylation, lipoylation, methylation, nitroalkylation, phosphopantetheinylation, phosphorylation, prenylation, selenation, S-nitrosylation, succinylation, sulfation, transglutamination, sulfinylation, sulfonylation and ubiquitination (sumoylation, neddylation).

Post-translational modifications occurring at the N-terminus of the amino acid chain play an important role in translocation across biological membranes. These include secretory proteins in prokaryotes and eukaryotes and also proteins that are intended to be incorporated in various cellular and organelle membranes such as lysosomes, chloroplast, mitochondria and plasma membrane. Expression of post-translated proteins is important in several diseases.

== See also ==
- Western blot
- Northwestern blot
- Far-eastern blot
- Blot
