= DdPCR =

ddPCR may refer to:

- Droplet Digital PCR, a form of digital polymerase chain reaction
- Differential display PCR
