= Graeme Doran =

English cricketer (born 1979)

Personal information
- Full name: Graeme Paul Doran
- Born: 2 December 1979 (age 46); Liverpool, Lancashire, England
- Batting: Right-handed
- Role: Wicket-keeper

Domestic team information
- Years: Team
- 2004–2005: Oxford University

Career statistics
Competition	First-class
Matches	2
Runs scored	9
Batting average	–
100s/50s	–/–
Top score	9*
Catches/stumpings	1/–
- Source: Cricinfo, 31 May 2020

Graeme Paul Doran (born 2 December 1979) is an English geneticist and a former first-class cricketer.

Doran was born at Liverpool in December 1979. He later went up to St Edmund Hall at the University of Oxford, where he studied genetics and biochemistry to doctorate level under the guidance of Dame Kay Davies and Sir Edwin Southern. While studying at Oxford, he made two appearances in first-class cricket for Oxford University in The University Matches of 2004 and 2005 against Cambridge University.

Since graduating, he has carried out research at MIT and Harvard.
