= SSC =

SSC may refer to:

== Education ==
=== Schools and universities ===
==== Australia ====
- Sydney Secondary College, a public school in Sydney, Australia
- St Stanislaus' College, Bathurst, New South Wales
- Santa Sabina College, Strathfield, New South Wales
- Saint Stephen's College, Coomera, Queensland
- Saint Scholastica's College, Australia

==== United States ====
- Saint Stanislaus College, a high school in Bay St. Louis, Mississippi
- Salem State University, a public college in Salem, Massachusetts
- Seminole State College (Oklahoma), a public college in Seminole, Oklahoma
- Seminole State College of Florida, a public college in Seminole County, Florida
- South Seattle College, a two-year public college in Seattle, Washington
- South Suburban College, a community college in South Holland, Illinois

==== Other schools and universities ====
- San Sebastian College – Recoletos in Manila, Philippines
- St. Scholastica's College, Manila, Philippines
- St Stephen's College, Hong Kong, in Stanley, Hong Kong Island
- St. Stephen's Girls' College, Hong Kong, in Pok Fu Lam, Hong Kong Island

=== Other uses in education ===
- Student selected components, optional elements in the syllabus of UK medical schools
- Secondary School Certificate, the certificate given to students graduating from a secondary school in India, Pakistan or Bangladesh
- Secondary School Leaving Certificate examination

== Organizations ==
=== Businesses ===
- Shanghai Supercomputer Center, a high-performance computing service provider
- Shared services center, outsourcing
- SSC North America, an automobile manufacturer
- Specialized System Consultants, a private media company
- Swedish Space Corporation, a Swedish government-owned company
- Southern Star Central Gas Pipeline, based in Owensboro, KY

=== Governmental organizations ===
- Saudi Space Commission, government agency of Saudi Arabia
- Secretaria de Seguridad Ciudadana, armed law enforcement agency in Mexico City
- Shared Services Canada
- Space Systems Command, the acquisition, research and development, and launch command of the United States Space Force
- Staff Selection Commission, conducts entry exams for Indian Government staff
- State Security Council of apartheid South Africa
- State Services Commission, oversees public sector performance in New Zealand
- Swiss Science Council, independent scientific advisory body of the Federal Council of Switzerland
- US Army Soldier Systems Center, Natick, Massachusetts

=== Other organizations ===
- Sangha Supreme Council, governs Buddhism in Thailand
- Sector skills council in the UK, a type of employers' organization for reducing skills gaps
- Sierra Student Coalition, a student-run arm of the Sierra Club, an environmental organization in the United States
- Singapore Symphony Chorus, choir of the Singapore Symphony Orchestra
- Sunday Service Choir, an American gospel group led by rapper Kanye West
- Society of the Holy Cross (Societas Sanctae Crucis), Anglo-Catholic society of male priests
- Society of Solicitors in the Supreme Courts of Scotland, a professional association of solicitors
- Species Survival Commission of the International Union for Conservation of Nature
- Statistical Society of Canada, promotes use and understanding of statistical methods

== Places ==
- Shaw Air Force Base, South Carolina, US (FAA code)
- Stennis Space Center, Mississippi
- Second Severn Crossing, a motorway bridge across the River Severn from England to Wales
- US Army Soldier Systems Center, Natick, Massachusetts
- Sool, Sanaag, and Cayn, three provinces in Somalia collectively known as North Eastern State since 2025
  - HBM-SSC, Militia based in SSC region
- Shetland Space Centre, a proposed spaceport in Scotland

== Science and technology ==
=== Computing and information technology ===
- IBM Secure Service Container
- Shanghai Supercomputer Center, a high-performance computing service provider
- Synchronous serial communication
- Synchronous Serial Controller
- Spread-spectrum clocking, a technique used to reduce electromagnetic interference (EMI) produced by synchronous digital systems (such as computer systems)
- SQL Server Compact, a small-footprint database from Microsoft
- Supplementary service codes
- SinuSoidal Coding used for audio in MPEG-4 Part 3
- Samsung Seamless Codec used for wireless audio via Bluetooth - proprietary A2DP audio codec

=== Life sciences ===
- Systemic sclerosis, a form of scleroderma
- Secondary sclerosing cholangitis, a chronic cholestatic liver disease
- Splenic sequestration crisis, an illness in pediatric sickle cell disease patients
- California species of special concern, a legal protective designation for at-risk wildlife in the state of California
- SSC buffer, a saline sodium citrate buffer commonly used in molecular biology and organic chemistry
- Stretch shortening cycle, a process of faster muscular contraction after a dynamic stretch
- Side-scattered light, a parameter of flow cytometry

=== Physical sciences ===
- Spatial Synoptic Classification system, which is a way of diagnosing the climate of a location using air mass theory
- Sulfide stress cracking, a type of corrosion
- Super star clusters, in astronomy, possible progenitors of globular clusters
- Superconducting Super Collider, a colliding beam particle accelerator partially built in Texas by the US government before being canceled in 1993

=== Technologies ===
- Thrust SSC, world's first supersonic land vehicle and current land speed record holder
- Ship-to-Shore Connector, a future air-cushion vehicle (hovercraft) of the United States Navy
- Soft structured carrier, a soft (often fabric) baby carrier
- Sistema Supporto Condotta, a kind of automated railway signalling in use on the Italian railway network
- Static synchronous compensator (STATCOM), a power electronics voltage-source converter

== Sport ==
- Saudi Sports Company, company of a television network
- Sinhalese Sports Club Cricket Ground, a venue for international cricket matches in Colombo, Sri Lanka
- Sinhalese Sports Club, a first-class cricket club based in Colombo, Sri Lanka
- Southern States Conference, a defunct NAIA conference in the United States
- Soviet Super Cup, a defunct association football cup in the Soviet Union
- Speed Skating Canada
- Sunshine State Conference, a sports organization in Florida

== Other uses ==
- Hull classification symbol for coastal submarine
- Safe, sane and consensual, a practice in BDSM
- Scottish Submarine Centre, a naval museum in Scotland
- SkyscraperCity, an online forum for urban discussion
- Slate Star Codex, a blog about philosophy, psychiatry, and pharmacology
- South–South cooperation between developing countries
- Strawberry Shortcake
- Syrian Satellite Channel, a satellite television channel owned by RTV Syria
