= Small nucleolar RNA SNORD103 =

Small nucleolar RNA SNORD103/SNORD85
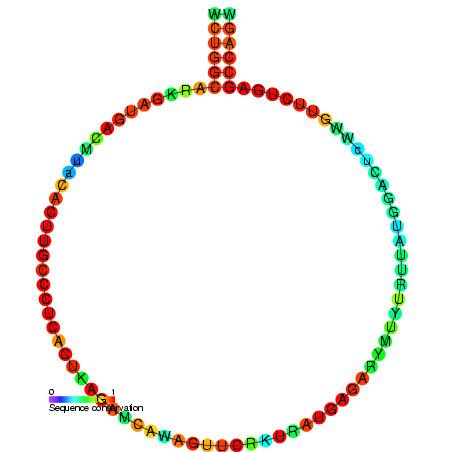
- Predicted secondary structure and sequence conservation of SNORD103

Identifiers
- Symbol: SNORD103
- Alt. Symbols: U103
- Rfam: RF00188

Other data
- RNA type: Gene; snRNA; snoRNA; CD-box
- Domain: Eukaryota
- GO: GO:0006396 GO:0005730
- SO: SO:0000593
- PDB structures: PDBe

In molecular biology, snoRNA U103 (also known as SNORD103) is a non-coding RNA (ncRNA) molecule which functions in the modification of other small nuclear RNAs (snRNAs). This type of modifying RNA is usually located in the nucleolus of the eukaryotic cell which is a major site of snRNA biogenesis. It is known as a small nucleolar RNA (snoRNA) and also often referred to as a guide RNA.

snoRNA U103 belongs to the C/D box class of snoRNAs which contain the conserved sequence motifs known as the C box (UGAUGA) and the D box (CUGA). Most of the members of the box C/D family function in directing site-specific 2'-O-methylation of substrate RNAs.

U103 was identified by computational screening of the introns of ribosomal protein genes for conserved C/D box sequence motifs and expression experimentally verified by northern blotting.

U103 is predicted to guide the 2'O-ribose methylation of 18S ribosomal RNA (rRNA) residue G601. In both the human and mouse genome there are two U103 gene copies (called U103A or SNORD103A and U103B or SNORD103B) located within introns 17 and 21 of the PUM1 gene.
