= BLCAP =

Protein-coding gene in humans

Identifiers
- Aliases: BLCAP, BC10, bladder cancer associated protein, apoptosis inducing factor, BLCAP apoptosis inducing factor
- External IDs: OMIM: 613110; MGI: 1858907; GeneCards: BLCAP

Gene location (Human)
Chr.	Chromosome 20 (human)
Band	20q11.23	Start	37,492,472 bp
Band	20q11.23	End	37,527,931 bp

Gene location (Mouse)
Chr.	Chromosome 2 (mouse)
Band	2 H1|2 78.4 cM	Start	157,398,282 bp
Band	2 H1|2 78.4 cM	End	157,413,194 bp
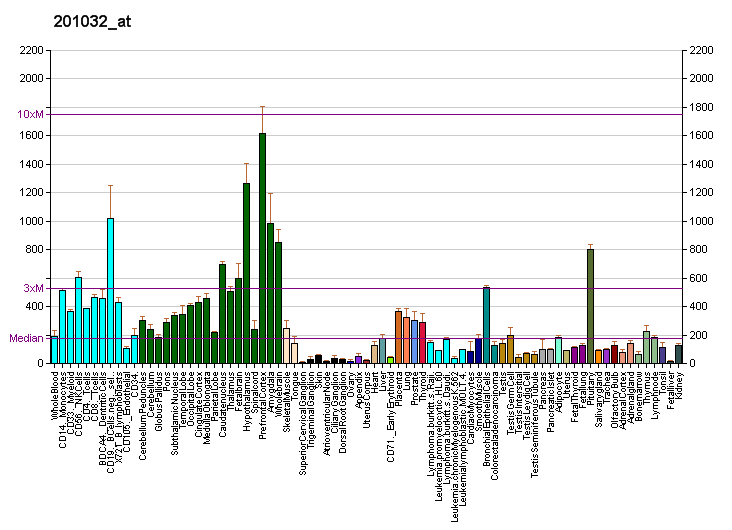
RNA expression pattern
Bgee	Human / Mouse (ortholog); Top expressed in: secondary oocyte; nucleus accumbens; middle frontal gyrus; tibialis anterior muscle; glutes; gastrocnemius muscle; right uterine tube; deltoid muscle; anterior pituitary; Brodmann area 23 / Top expressed in: suprachiasmatic nucleus; dorsomedial hypothalamic nucleus; paraventricular nucleus of hypothalamus; ventromedial nucleus; habenula; neural layer of retina; ventral tegmental area; lateral hypothalamus; subiculum; secondary oocyte; More reference expression data
BioGPS	More reference expression data
Gene ontology
Molecular function	protein binding
Cellular component	integral component of membrane; membrane
Biological process	cell cycle; apoptotic nuclear changes; apoptotic process
Sources:Amigo / QuickGO
Orthologs
Databases	NCBI: entry; OMA: entry
Species	Human	Mouse
Entrez	10904	53619
Ensembl	ENSG00000166619	ENSMUSG00000067787
UniProt	P62952	P62951
RefSeq (mRNA)	NM_006698; NM_001167820; NM_001167821; NM_001167822; NM_001167823 NM_001317074; NM_001317075	NM_016916; NM_001355426
RefSeq (protein)	NP_001161292; NP_001161293; NP_001161294; NP_001161295; NP_001304003 NP_001304004; NP_006689	NP_058612; NP_001342355
Location (UCSC)	Chr 20: 37.49 – 37.53 Mb	Chr 2: 157.4 – 157.41 Mb
PubMed search
- Wikidata
View/Edit Human	View/Edit Mouse

Bladder cancer-associated protein is a protein that in humans is encoded by the BLCAP gene.

== Function ==
BLCAP was identified using a differential display procedure with tumor biopsies obtained from a noninvasive and an invasive bladder transitional cell carcinoma. Although database searches revealed no homology to any human gene at the time of identification, mouse, rat and zebrafish orthologs have since been identified. The protein appears to be down-regulated during bladder cancer progression.

The protein also known as BC10 is an 87-amino-acid-long protein, but its biological functions are largely unknown. However it is a widely believed that the protein is involved in tumour suppression by decreasing cell growth through initiating apoptosis. It is widely expressed protein but expression is particularly high in brain and B lymphocytes. Alternative promoters and alternative splicing allow the protein to exist as several different transcript variants. This number is further increased as the pre-mRNA of this protein is subject to several RNA editing events.

== Structure ==
The structure of the protein is predicted to be a globular protein with 2 transmembrane (TM) domains.

== RNA editing ==
The human BLCAP gene is composed of two exons which are separated by an intron. Exon 1 of the gene encodes a 5′ sequence of the 5′UTR while exon 2 includes the remaining sequence of the 5′UTR, the coding region and the 3′UTR. The coding sequence of the BLCAP gene is therefore intronless.

=== Type ===
A to I RNA editing is catalyzed by a family of adenosine deaminases acting on RNA (ADARs) that specifically recognize adenosines within double-stranded regions of pre-mRNAs and deaminate them to inosine. Inosines are recognised as guanosine by the cells translational machinery. There are three members of the ADAR family ADARs 1–3 with ADAR 1 and ADAR 2 being the only enzymatically active members.ADAR3 is thought to have a regulatory role in the brain. ADAR1 and ADAR 2 are widely expressed in tissues while ADAR 3 is restricted to the brain. The double stranded regions of RNA are formed by base-pairing between residues in the close to region of the editing site with residues usually in a neighboring intron but can be an exonic sequence. The region that base pairs with the editing region is known as an Editing Complementary Sequence (ECS).

=== Location ===
The editing sites are all concentrated together between the last 150 nucleotides of intron 1 and the beginning of exon 2. There are 17 identified editing sites in total in the pre-mRNA of this protein. Of these, 11 are found within the intronic sequence (1–11), 3 are in the 5'UTR region (5a,5b,5c) while 3 are found within the coding sequence (Y/C site, Q/R site, K/R site). Some of these editing sites occur in the highly conserved amino terminal of the protein.

The Y/C editing site is located at amino acid 2 of the final protein. The codon change introduces a tyrosine (UAU) to a (UGU) cysteine substitution.

The Q/R site is a second coding region found at amino acid 5 of the final protein. Here the glutamine (Q_) is codon is converted to an arginine (R).

The third K/R editing site within the coding sequence is found at amino acid position 15 of the final protein where a Lysine is converted to an Arginine.

The ECS is predicted to be found in the intron with the double stranded structure formed containing all 17 of the editing sites. It is likely since all the editing sites fall within the duplex region that editing occurs in exonic and intronic sequences at the same time. There is a high level of conservation of the last 150 nucleotides of the intronic region and the start of exon 2.

=== Regulation ===
The BLCAP protein is expressed in a wide range of tissues not just those associated with the nervous system. This indicates that editing may involve ADAR 1 enzyme. However ADAR1 and ADAR2 have been demonstrated to cooperate to edit BLCAP transcript. The pre-mRNA of this protein is edited in many tissues( heart, bladder, lymphocytes, fibroblast, epithelial cells and brain) but the frequency of editing varies in different tissues. There is an overall decrease in BLCAP-editing level in Astrocytomas, Bladder cancer and Colorectal cancer when compared with the relevant normal tissues. HEK 293t cells transfected with either EGFP-ADAR1, EGFP-ADAR2 or untransfected HEK293 cells were used to determine which ADAR enzyme is involved in editing at specific sites in 5'UTR and coding region. The editing level at the Y/C site was 16% while in tumour cells was an average of 21% in brain. It has been shown that ADAR1 does not edit the sites in 5' UTR but ADAR2 edits 5b and 5c sites.Y/c is edited by both and edits the Q/R and K/R sites at higher levels than ADAR1. Low levels of editing are also detected in untransfected vectors. These results indicate that ADAR1 and ADAR2 can edited all sites with ADAR2 being more efficient at the majority of sites.

=== Effects ===
Editing at the Q/R and K/R sites result in positively charge amino acids being placed in the conserved amino terminal of the protein. The three possible editing sites in the coding sequence can result in the translation of up to 8 different protein isoforms. The possible changes to protein function caused by editing is unknown at the current time.
