= Small nucleolar RNA SNORA11 =

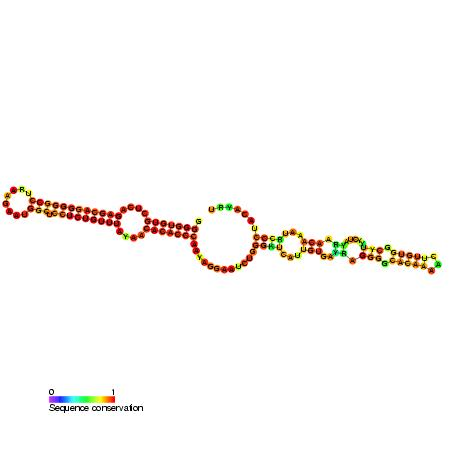
- Predicted secondary structure and sequence conservation of SNORA11

Identifiers
- Symbol: SNORA11
- Rfam: RF00614

Other data
- RNA type: Gene; snRNA; snoRNA; H/ACA-box
- Domain: Eukaryota
- GO: GO:0006396 GO:0005730
- SO: SO:0000594
- PDB structures: PDBe

In molecular biology, small nucleolar RNA SNORA11 (also known as U107) is a non-coding RNA (ncRNA) molecule which functions in the biogenesis (modification) of other small nuclear RNAs (snRNAs). This type of modifying RNA is located in the nucleolus of the eukaryotic cell which is a major site of snRNA biogenesis. It is known as a small nucleolar RNA (snoRNA).

U107 has a predicted hairpin-hinge-hairpin-tail structure and is predicted to be a member of the H/ACA box class of snoRNAs that guide the sites of modification of uridines to pseudouridines. This snoRNA was identified by RT-PCR from blood cells and its expression confirmed by Northern blot analysis. There is no predicted RNA target for this guide snRNA.
