= S2C =

S2C may refer to:

- S2C reactor, US nuclear reactor design
- Spelling to Communicate, discredited communication technique in disabled care
- S2CID, academic paper identifier

== See also ==
- SC2 (disambiguation)
- SSC (disambiguation)
