= Arginylation =

Post-translational modification

In arginylation, arginine (pictured above) is added to proteins.

Arginylation is a post-translational modification in which proteins are modified by the addition of arginine (Arg) at the N-terminal amino group or side chains of reactive amino acids by the enzyme, arginyltransferase (ATE1). Recent studies have also revealed that hundreds of proteins in vivo are arginylated, proteins which are essential for many biological pathways. While still poorly understood in a biological setting, the ATE1 enzyme is highly conserved which suggests that arginylation is an important biological post-translational modification.

Examples of ATE1 targets which have been identified include ornithine decarboxylase., thyroglobulin, insulin, and neurotensin.

== Discovery ==
In 1963, a group of researchers observed that specific radioactive amino acids were being incorporated into proteins obtained from ribosome-free cell and tissue extracts. This incorporation of amino acids into ribosome-lacking cells was first observed in prokaryotes using leucine (Leu) and phenylalanine (Phe), and was further discovered in mammalian liver extracts using arginine. The incorporation of other amino acids into ribosome-lacking cells failed to yield similar results, suggesting that the mechanism was specific to leucine and phenylalanine in bacteria and arginine in mammals. One of the most interesting aspects of arginylation is that the amino acids used for arginylation are transferred from aminoacyl tRNAs onto the target protein, without the use of any other translational components. This way of modifying proteins post-translationally does not occur in any other amino acid addition to proteins, such as in glycylation, glutamylation, and tyrosination making arginylation truly unique.

Upon discovery of this modification and its mechanism, further research was performed to identify an enzyme or enzymes which promote this modification. After identifying the enzyme responsible for this modification in both plants and guinea-pig hair follicles, it was cloned and characterized in yeast and given the name ATE1 due to its ability. Later studies have also identified various genes which code for ATE1 enzymes in multiple species, leading to the conclusion that ATE1 is present in all eukaryotes.

== Target sites ==
=== N-terminus ===
General structure of the N-terminus of an amino acid within a peptide (in arginylation, this amino acid is commonly asparagine or glutamine).

Upon the identification of the early targets of arginylation by ATE1 (in vitro and in vivo), a pattern emerged. This pattern showed that ATE1 displayed a high affinity for proteins and peptides containing the acidic amino acids asparagine or glutamine which were exposed on the N-terminal side of the protein or peptide. Further studies aided by high precision mass spectrometry have revealed hundreds of proteins from different cells and tissues which have been arginylated. Several of these proteins also displayed arginylation at their N-chain termini, but contained residues other than asparagine or glutamine. As such, arginylation studies are still in the introductory stages and further research into the specificity of arginylation must be performed.

However, the assumption that arginylation only occurs at the N-terminus severely limited the amount of proteins which were likely to be arginylated. This is due to the fact that, if the preference of arginylation to occur only at the N-terminus assumption was true, then arginylation would never be able to happen on intact proteins due to protein sequences beginning with methionine at the N-terminus and not the preferred asparagine or glutamine. This assumption was soon proved false when a protein was discovered with an arginylated residue in the middle of its sequence.

=== Mid-chain ===
Although N-terminus arginylation was originally thought to be the only site for targeting by ATE1 enzymes, it has recently been discovered that arginylation may also occur in the middle of the peptide chain of a protein. The first discovery of this unprecedented modification occurred when neurotensin, a biological peptide found in the central nervous system, was isolated from cells and it was discovered that arginine was attached to a mid-chain glutamine residue. This discovery changed the view of how arginylation occurs, as this meant that there may be ways to modify and arginylate intact proteins.

In an effort to determine the prevalence of mid-chain arginylation, a mass spectrometry screen of various peptides was performed. The results from this experiment revealed a plethora of various proteins which contained modified asparagine and glutamine residues present in the middle of their peptide chain, and further studies determined that ATE1 could also be mediating this reaction. Indeed, this discovery changed the biological scope of arginylation by suggesting that arginylation can also occur on fully intact proteins, not just on the N-terminus of protein fragments or pre-processed proteins.

== Consequences ==
In 1986, the N-end rule was elucidated, and it states that the identity of the amino acid at the N-terminus of the protein's amino acid sequence determines the half-life of the protein. In an effort to determine the effects of arginylation on the half-life of proteins, several studies were performed using modified yeast proteins. These studies revealed that when proteins were engineered to include N-termini which had been arginylated, the modified proteins were metabolically unstable. Furthermore, it was also discovered that protein ubiquitination and degradation become more likely to occur when a protein is arginylated. The evidence gathered from these experiments make it clear that arginylation in vivo leads to the degradation of proteins with asparagine and glutamine residues at their N-termini.

However, there have also been several recent studies which have shown that protein degradation may not be the prevalent function of arginylation, but that this modification may also be important for certain proteins to function correctly. For instance, when arginylation occurs on beta amyloid proteins, the proteins are guided into their proper alpha helical shape and are also prevented from misfolding and aggregating. Another protein which benefits from arginylation is calreticulin because when modified, its role during endoplasmic reticulum stress is facilitated, rather than it being removed from cells entirely. As both degradation and facilitation effects of arginylation have been identified and studied, it is clear that arginylation has an important role in protein regulation within cells.

== Regulation ==
Due to it being a lesser understood post-translational modification, arginylation and its regulation in vivo still remains largely esoteric. The expression of ATE1 can vary significantly within different tissues, but its levels within these tissues peak at mid-development but begin to decline as an organism ages. It has also been observed that a variety of physiological compounds and drugs are able to affect the incorporation of arginine in vivo, but it is hypothesized that this occurs in a non-specific manner. As such, it has been theorized that inhibitors and activators which regulate ATE1 activity, and therefore arginylation, may exist in vivo.

Arginylation's ability to make proteins metabolically unstable, as observed in yeast, makes proteins which have been modified in this way an attractive target for removal. One of the well characterized arginylation regulators is the ubiquitin dependent protein degradation which quickly degrades and removes harmful proteins. This important regulator of arginylation facilitates the specificity of this post-translational modification and efficiently removes proteins which were not meant to be arginylated in vivo.

Lastly, an unproven but highly attractive mechanism of regulating arginylation in vivo suggests the use of de-arginylation enzymes which may be able to remove an arginine that has been added post-translationally to proteins. Enzymes such as Aminopeptidase B and Carboxypeptidase B are able to remove arginine from a proteins N-terminus and from side chain carboxyl groups, respectively, but do not specifically target arginylated sites. The proposed de-arginylation enzymes are theorized to act in the same way as the previously mentioned enzymes Aminopeptidase B and Carboxypeptidase B, but would differ in the fact that they specifically target arginylated protein substrates. Although these enzymes have not been discovered as of yet, the search for and discovery of these enzymes is an exciting path for further studies.

== Pathways regulated by ==
Newborn mouse pup with ATE1 knockout (left bottom) exhibits shallow, rapid breathing, eventually resulting in the accumulation of air in the abdominal cavity and death. In contrast its littermate control (right top) breathes regularly and exhibits no visible abnormalities.

Initially written off as a non-essential process due to the ATE1 knockout in yeast, later studies have shown arginylation plays a significant role in several biological processes. The knockout of ATE1 in mice and Drosophila resulted in embryonic lethality for both species. Further studies using the mouse model to observe the effects of ATE1 knockout in the development of the organism revealed that the gene loss resulted in abnormal cardiac and craniofacial morphogenesis, impaired angiogenesis, and the ability of cells to undergo meiosis. Postnatally, ATE1 knockout resulted in weight loss, infertility, and intellectual disability. Additionally, observing the effects of ATE1 deletion in Arabidopsis thaliana, a model plant organism, revealed defective shoot and leaf development, abnormal seed germination, and delayed leaf senescence. The dysfunctions resulting from the knockout of the ATE1 enzyme therefore suggest that arginylation is necessary for many physiological pathways within eukaryotes.

== See also ==
- Post-translational modifications
- Ubiquitin
