= Blotting matrix =

A blotting matrix, in molecular biology and genetics, is the substrate onto which macromolecules, such as proteins, are transferred in a blot method. The matrices are generally chemically modified paper filters or microporous membrane filters. In a dot blot, macromolecules are applied directly to the matrix. Macromolecules can also be separated and transferred via gel electrophoresis.

One of the most common blotting matrices for protein analysis is nitrocellulose, which has a high affinity for proteins due to hydrophobic interactions. However, proteins with low molecular weight have a small affinity for nitrocellulose, limiting potential applications. This defect may be remedied by glutaraldehyde, which can covalently bond proteins to nitrocellulose. Another matrix is cellulose paper modified with diazophenylthiother, which can also facilitate covalent bonding of proteins. Nylon membranes are also used for protein blotting, although they may result in the binding of anionic dyes such as Coomassie blue and Amido black. Polyvinylidene fluoride membranes are also commonly used, due to their hydrophobicity.
