= SSC buffer =

In biochemistry and molecular biology, saline-sodium citrate (SSC) buffer is used as a hybridization buffer, to control stringency for washing steps in protocols for Southern blotting, in situ hybridization, DNA Microarray or Northern blotting. 20X SSC may be used to prevent drying of agarose gels during a vacuum transfer.

A 20X stock solution consists of 3 M sodium chloride and 300 mM trisodium citrate (adjusted to pH 7.0 with HCl).

== See also ==
- Southern Blot
- Northern Blot
- DNA Microarray
- DNA Fingerprinting
