= Arginyltransferase =

arginyltransferase

Identifiers
- EC no.: 2.3.2.8
- CAS no.: 37257-24-2

Databases
- IntEnz: IntEnz view
- BRENDA: BRENDA entry
- ExPASy: NiceZyme view
- KEGG: KEGG entry
- MetaCyc: metabolic pathway
- PRIAM: profile
- PDB structures: RCSB PDB PDBe PDBsum
- Gene Ontology: AmiGO / QuickGO
Search
- PMC: articles
- PubMed: articles
- NCBI: proteins

In enzymology, an arginyltransferase (EC 2.3.2.8) is an enzyme that catalyzes the chemical reaction

L-arginyl-tRNA + protein $\rightleftharpoons$ tRNA + L-arginyl-protein

Thus, the two substrates of this enzyme are L-arginyl-tRNA and protein, whereas its two products are tRNA and L-arginyl-protein.

This enzyme belongs to the family of transferases, specifically the aminoacyltransferases. The systematic name of this enzyme class is L-arginyl-tRNA:protein arginyltransferase. Other names in common use include arginine transferase, arginyl-transfer ribonucleate-protein aminoacyltransferase, arginyl-transfer ribonucleate-protein transferase, and arginyl-tRNA protein transferase. It has 2 cofactors: mercaptoethanol, and Cation.
