= Splenic sequestration crisis =

Illness

Splenic sequestration crisis is a condition that occurs when sickled red blood cells get trapped in the spleen resulting in acute enlargement of the spleen (splenomegaly), a drop in hemoglobin (anemia), and decreased blood volume in the body which can lead to hypovolemic shock and death. This occurs most commonly in young children with sickle cell disease but can also occur in patients with hemoglobin SC disease or sickle beta thalassemia. Treatment involves immediate blood transfusion to improve anemia and low blood volume as well as to trigger trapped red blood cells in the spleen to re-enter normal circulation. Recurrence of splenic sequestration crisis is common and may continue as long as the patient has a functional spleen.

== Classification ==
Splenic sequestration is when red blood cells get trapped in the spleen resulting in splenic enlargement and decreased red blood count throughout the rest of the body. To be classified as a splenic sequestration crisis, there must be sudden enlargement of the spleen with a 2-3 g/dL drop in hemoglobin.

== Epidemiology ==
Acute splenic sequestration crisis occurs in young children with sickle cell disease as well as older children or adults with hemoglobin SC disease or sickle beta thalassemia. A sequestration crisis most commonly affects sickle cell anemia patients prior to 5 years old when their spleen is still functional with a majority of cases occurring before 2 years old. In sickle cell patients, the prevalence of acute splenic sequestration is between 7-30%. The variation in prevalence is seen in different populations throughout the globe. In a 2021 systematic review studying Sickle Cell Disease complications in Africa, <10% of children had an occurrence of splenic sequestration crisis which was lower than rates seen in other places around the world. Recurrence occurs in about 50-78% of patients.

== Pathophysiology ==
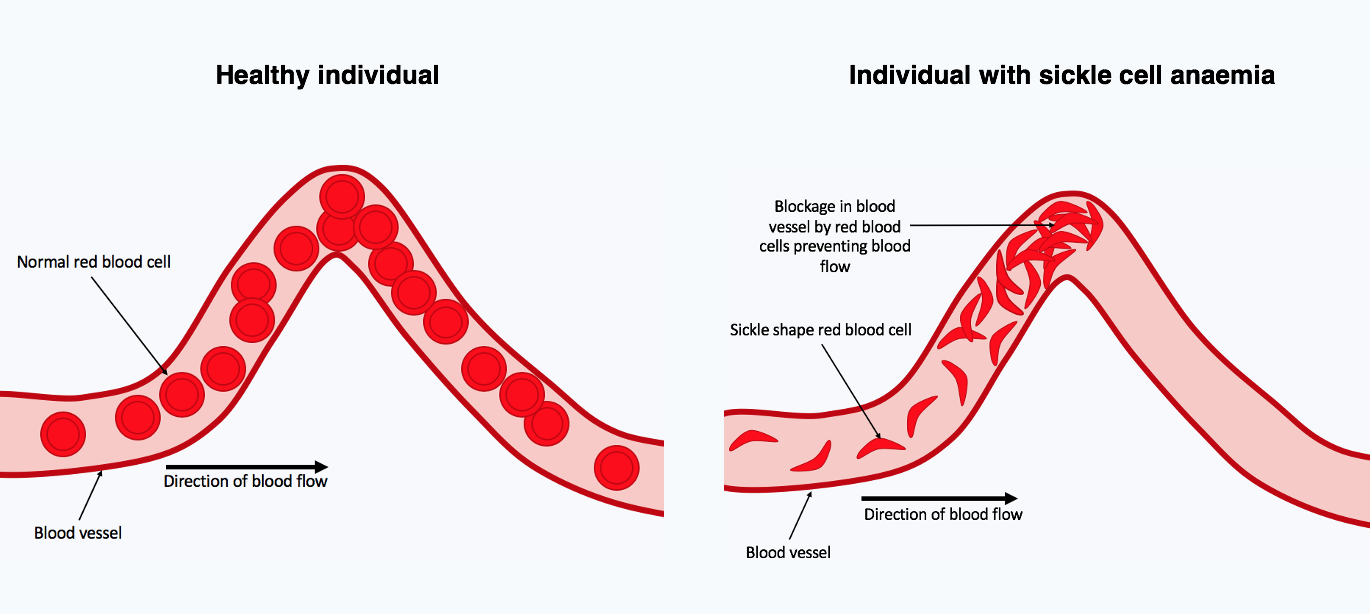
Image showing normal red blood cells flowing through a blood vessel in comparison to sickled red blood cells. Sickle cells seen adhering to each other and blocking flow through the blood vessel.

The spleen is an organ found in the upper left side of the abdomen that acts as a filter for blood in the body as well as plays a role in the immune system. Through very small vessels it filters and removes old or damaged red blood cells (RBCs) and destroys bacteria or viruses found in the blood. In patients with sickle cell anemia, their red blood cells contain an abnormal variant of hemoglobin which results in red blood cells taking on a sickled shape, especially in conditions with low oxygen such as being filtered in the spleen. Sickled red blood cells stick together and get trapped in the small vessels of the spleen which can lead to scarring. Often the trapping self-resolves and the RBCs can return to normal circulation throughout the body. Occasionally, instead of resolving, as more sickled red blood cells flow through the spleen, they adhere to the already trapped RBCs causing a bigger blockage. As more blood cells get sequestered in the spleen, the spleen enlarges and less blood returns to circulation. If splenic sequestration of blood becomes significant, resulting in decreased blood throughout the rest of the body, the patient is experiencing an acute splenic sequestration crisis which may lead to hypovolemic shock and death.

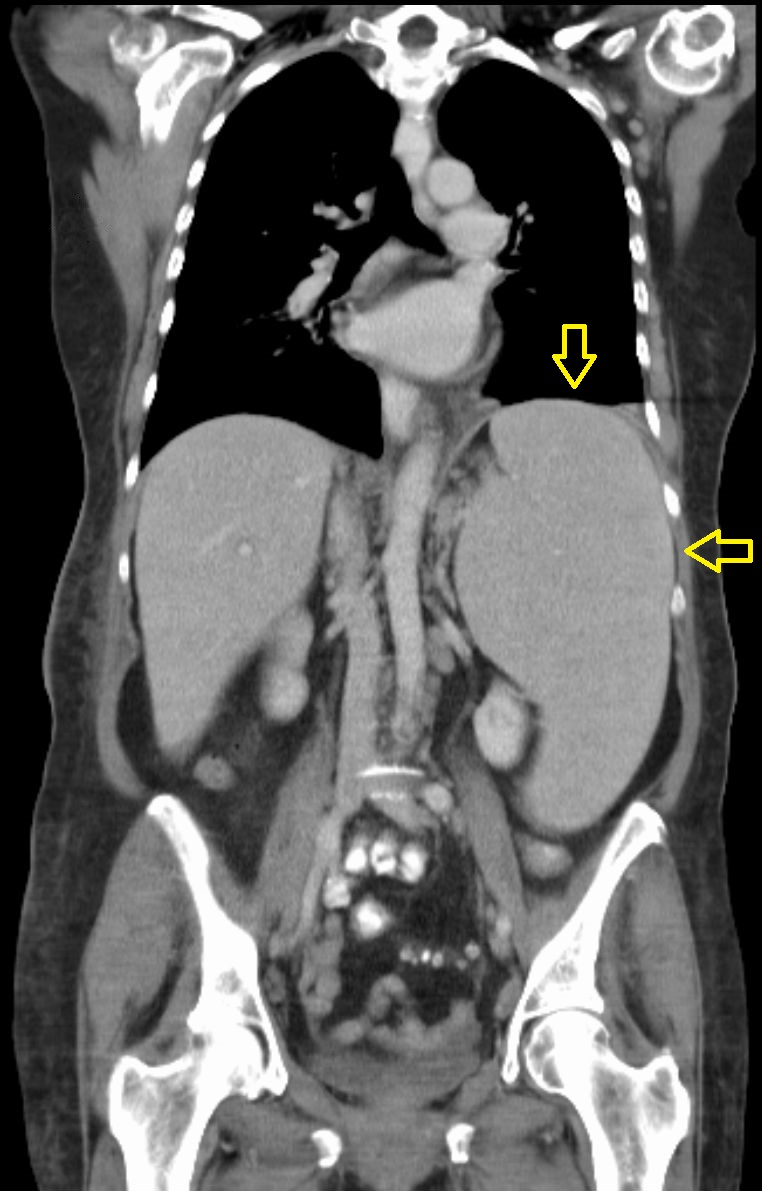
CT scan showing splenomegaly.

== Signs and Symptoms ==
- Left-sided abdominal pain (area of spleen)
- Fatigue or low energy
- Irritability
- Pallor
- Dizziness
- Headache
- Low appetite
- Splenomegaly
- Elevated heart rate
- Low blood pressure

The signs and symptoms of splenic sequestration crisis present due to the sudden development of splenomegaly, anemia, and decreased blood volume.

== Evaluation ==
Splenic sequestration crisis is diagnosed based on the presence of the symptoms discussed in the section above and a finding of sudden increasing splenomegaly on exam. Work up includes a complete blood count (CBC) with differential to evaluate the severity of anemia and rule out other potential causes of the patient’s symptoms. Imaging is not required because the diagnosis can be made based on patient history and physical exam.

== Treatment ==
=== Acute Management ===
Splenic sequestration crises with a sudden 2-3 g/dL drop in hemoglobin are an emergency and require immediate blood transfusion to resolve the anemia and low blood volume. The transfusion of red blood cells resolves the patient’s anemia by increasing the level of hemoglobin in the blood. Additionally, adding more blood to the circulation increases the overall blood volume in the body, helping resolve hypovolemic shock if present. Transfusion also triggers the release of trapped sickle cells in the spleen allowing for resolution of the underlying problem. The combination of transfused blood added to the system and previously trapped red blood cells reentering the circulation can result in thickening of the blood, potentially leading to hyperviscosity syndrome. Due to the possibility of this complication, low-volume red blood cell transfusions (5-10 mL/kg) are the standard treatment for splenic sequestration crisis because they partially correct anemia but do not overcorrect blood volume. More specifically, hemoglobin should not increase more than 1-1.1 g/dL from transfusion to allow for sequestered RBCs returning to circulation to further restore the hemoglobin level back to baseline.

Not all cases of splenic sequestration result in a significant drop in hemoglobin (Hb <7 g/dL or decreased by 2-3 g/dL from baseline) and therefore do not require immediate transfusion. In these cases, monitoring hemoglobin counts with CBC and checking spleen size are appropriate management. Intravenous fluids may be given to patients if their hemoglobin levels are not severely low.

Splenic sequestration crises have been found to be associated with fever and infection in sickle cell patients so acute treatment must also target an underlying infection.

=== Chronic Management ===
Chronic management of splenic sequestration crisis is based on patient history and family preference for managing recurrent episodes. Expectant management is when families wait for a new episode to occur and then treat it acutely. Splenectomy, the full or partial removal of the spleen, can prevent recurrence of a splenic sequestration crisis, however this is controversial due to increased risk for infections without a spleen. Splenectomy may be recommended either after the first severe case of splenic sequestration crisis or following the first recurrence. Scheduled red blood cell transfusions can also prevent recurrence by increasing the level of normal shaped red blood cells in the blood compared to sickled RBCs. Patients undergoing chronic transfusions however are at risk of having too much iron in the blood. The chronic management of splenic sequestration crisis in sickle cell disease patients is short-lived because they go through the process of autosplenectomy by age 5. Autosplenectomy is when the spleen becomes shrunken and nonfunctional due to repeated events of low blood supply and tissue death in patients with sickle cell disease. In patients with Hemoglobin SC disease or sickle beta thalassemia, recurrences of splenic sequestration crisis can occur into older childhood or adulthood because their spleen remains functional for a longer period of time.

Allogeneic hematopoietic stem cell transplantation (allo-HSCT) is a treatment being studied to potentially cure sickle cell disease and transfusion-dependent beta thalassemia by donating stem cells that make normal hemoglobin. In a 2025 systematic literature review, splenic sequestration crisis did not occur in any of the studies following allogeneic hematopoietic stem cell transplantation.

== Outcomes ==
Splenic sequestration crisis was previously a leading cause of death in young children with sickle cell disease. However, within the past 40 years the rates of death decreased from as high as 44% to <1%. This decrease in mortality rate is associated with initiating newborn screening for sickle cell disease and education on splenic sequestration crisis. Parental education includes learning the signs and symptoms of splenic sequestration crisis, how to palpate for an enlarged spleen and when medical evaluation is necessary. Because splenic sequestration crisis is an emergency, positive outcomes rely on receiving timely treatment. In a systematic review all eleven deaths reported due to splenic sequestration crisis were because the standard treatment of blood transfusion was not available.
