= Southern blot =

DNA analysis technique

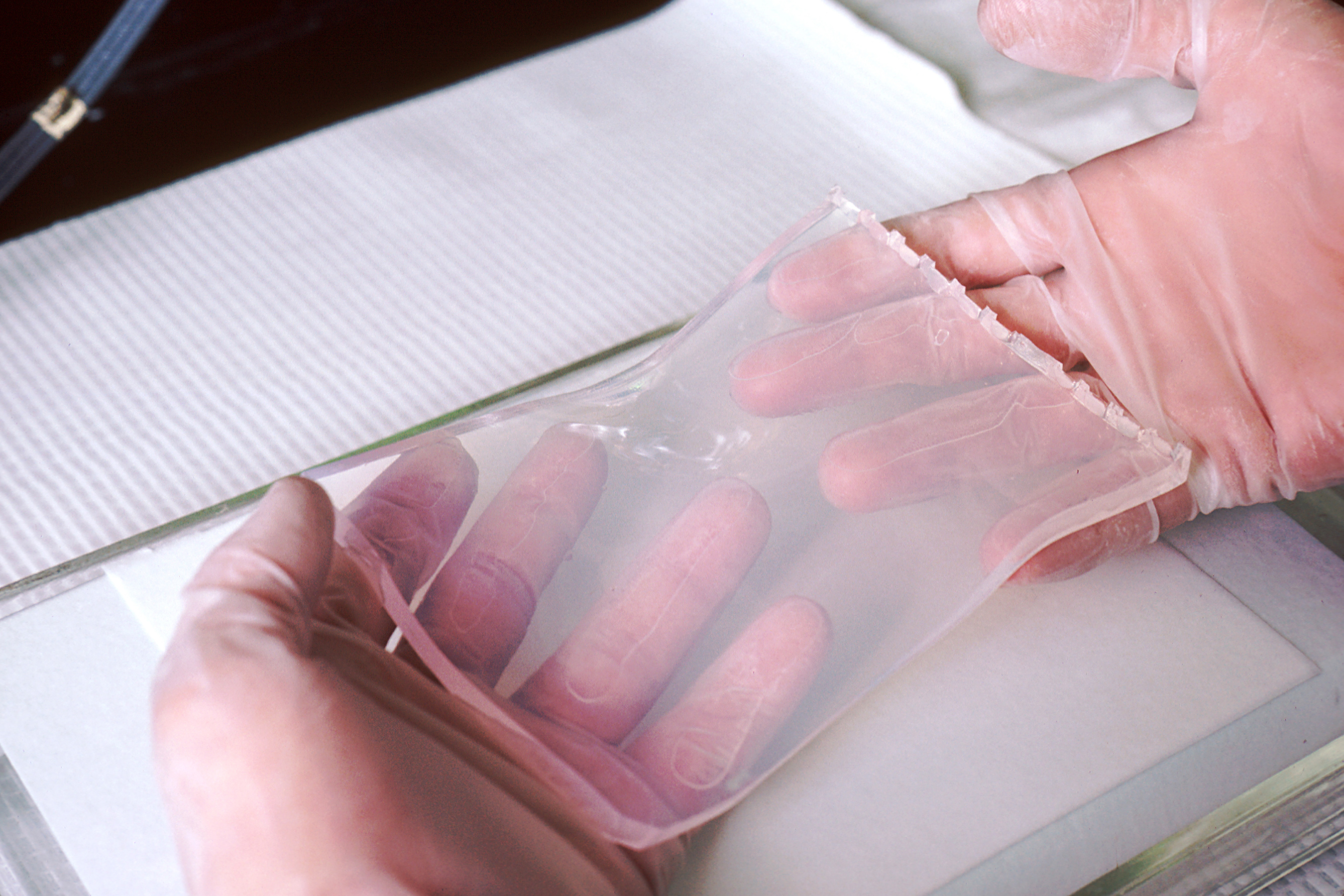
Agarose gel

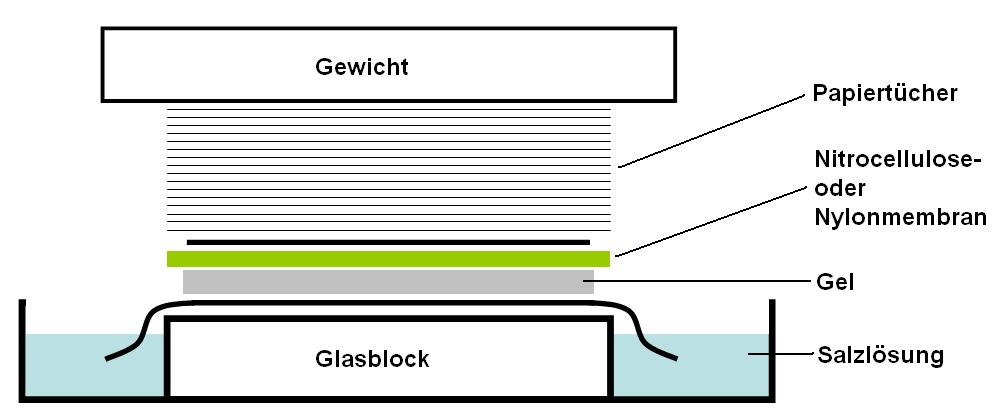
Tray with a stack consisting top down of a weight, paper towels, membrane of nitrocellulose or nylon, gel, salt solution and a slab of glass.

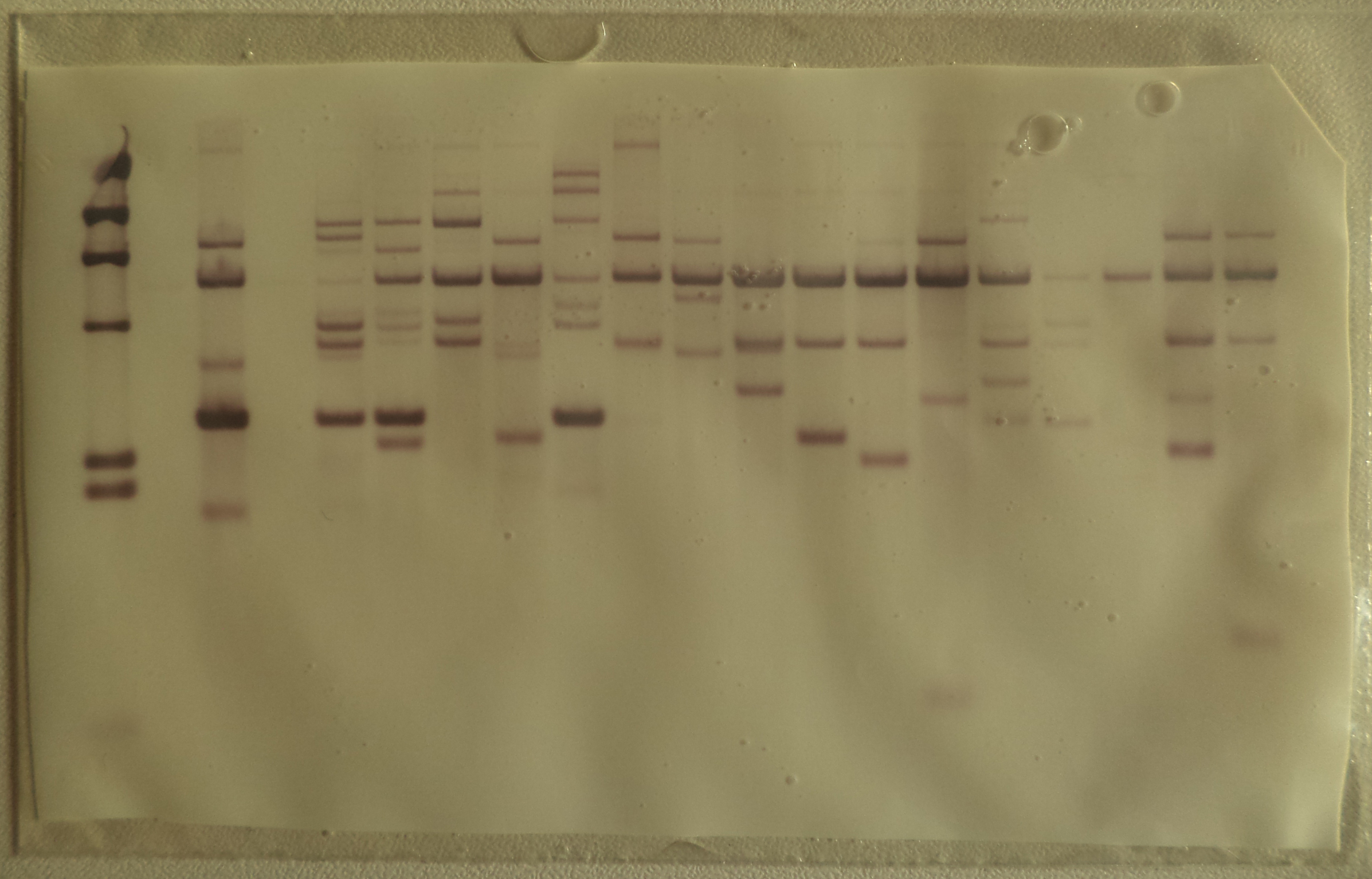
Southern blot membrane after hybridization and rinsing.

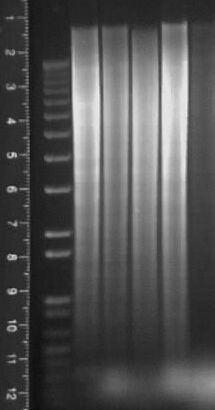
Southern blot agarose gel under ultraviolet illumination.

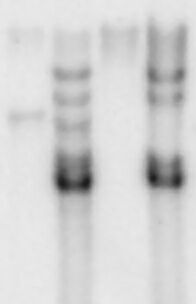
Southern blot autoradiogram.

Southern blot is a method used for detection and quantification of a specific DNA sequence in DNA samples. This method is used in molecular biology. Briefly, purified DNA from a biological sample (such as blood or tissue) is digested with restriction enzymes, and the resulting DNA fragments are separated by electrophoresis using an electric current to move them through a sieve-like gel or matrix, which allows smaller fragments to move faster than larger fragments. The DNA fragments are transferred out of the gel or matrix onto a solid membrane, which is then exposed to a DNA probe labeled with a radioactive, fluorescent, or chemical tag. The tag allows any DNA fragments containing complementary sequences with the DNA probe sequence to be visualized within the Southern blot.

The Southern blotting combines the transfer of electrophoresis-separated DNA fragments to a filter membrane in a process called blotting, and the subsequent fragment detection by probe hybridization.

The method is named after the British biologist Edwin Southern, who first published it in 1975. Other blotting methods (i.e., western blot, northern blot, eastern blot, southwestern blot) that employ similar principles, but using RNA or protein, have later been named for compass directions as a sort of pun from Southern's name. As the label is eponymous, Southern is capitalized, as is conventional of proper nouns. The names for other blotting methods may follow this convention, by analogy.

== History ==
Southern invented Southern blot after combining three innovations. The first one is the restriction endonucleases, which were developed at Johns Hopkins University by Tom Kelly and Hamilton Smith. Those restriction endonucleases are used to cut the DNA at a specific sequence. Kenneth and Noreen Murray introduced this technique as Southern. The second innovation is the gel electrophoresis that is based on separation of mixtures of DNA, RNA, or proteins according to molecular size, which was also developed at Johns Hopkins University, by Daniel Nathans and Kathleen Danna in 1971. The third innovation is the blotting-through method which was developed by Frederick Sanger, when he transferred RNA molecules to DEAE paper. Southern blot was invented in 1973 but it was not published until 1975. Although it was published later the technique was disseminated when Southern introduced the Southern blot technique to a scientist at Cold Spring Harbor Laboratory called Michael Mathews by drawing this technique on a paper.

== Method ==
The genomic DNA is digested with either one or more than one restriction enzyme, then the DNA fragments are size-fractionated by gel electrophoresis. Before the DNA fragments are transferred to a solid membrane which is either nylon or nitrocellulose membrane they are first denatured by alkaline treatment. After the DNA fragments are immobilized on the membrane, prehybridization methods are used to reduce non-specific probe binding. Then the fragments on the membrane are hybridized with either radiolabeled or nonradioactive labeled DNA, RNA, or oligonucleotide probes that are complementary to the target DNA sequence. Then detection methods are used to visualize the target DNA.

1. DNA Isolation: The DNA to be studied is isolated from various tissues. The most suitable source of DNA is known as blood tissue. However, it can be isolated from different tissues (hair, semen, saliva, etc.).
2. DNA digestion: Restriction endonucleases are used to cut high-molecular-weight DNA strands into smaller fragments. This is done by adding the desired amount of DNA which can be changed according to the probe used and the intricacy of the DNA, with the restriction enzyme, enzyme buffer and purified water. Then everything is incubated at 37 °C overnight.
3. Gel electrophoresis: The DNA fragments are then electrophoresed on an agarose gel to separate them by size. If some of the DNA fragments are larger than 15 kb, then before blotting, the gel may be treated with an acid, such as dilute HCl. This depurinates the DNA fragments, breaking the DNA into smaller pieces, thereby allowing more efficient transfer from the gel to membrane.
4. Denaturation: If alkaline transfer methods are used, the DNA gel is placed into an alkaline solution (typically containing sodium hydroxide) to denature the double-stranded DNA. The denaturation in an alkaline environment may improve binding of the negatively charged thymine residues of DNA to a positively charged amino groups of membrane, separating it into single DNA strands for later hybridization to the probe (see below), and destroys any residual RNA that may still be present in the DNA. The choice of alkaline over neutral transfer methods, however, is often empirical and may result in equivalent results.
5. Blotting: A sheet of nitrocellulose (or, alternatively, nylon) membrane is placed on top of (or below, depending on the direction of the transfer) the gel. Pressure is applied constantly to the gel (either using suction, or by placing a stack of paper towels and a weight on top of the membrane and gel), to ensure good and even contact between gel and membrane. If transferring by suction, 20X SSC buffer is used to ensure a seal and prevent drying of the gel. Buffer transfer by capillary action from a region of high water potential to a region of low water potential (usually filter paper and paper tissues) is then used to move the DNA from the gel onto the membrane; ion exchange interactions bind the DNA to the membrane due to the negative charge of the DNA and positive charge of the membrane. Five methods can be used to transfer DNA fragments to the solid membrane and they are:
  1. Upward capillary transfer: This method transfers the DNA fragment upward from the gel to the membrane where the flow of the liquid or the buffer will be upward.
  2. Downward capillary transfer: This method is done by placing the gel on the surface of the membrane (usually nylon charged membrane) and the DNA fragments will be transferred in a downward direction with the flow of the alkaline buffer.
  3. Simultaneous transfer to two membranes: This method is used to transfer DNA fragments of high concentration simultaneously from the gel to two membranes.
  4. Electrophoretic transfer: This method usually uses large electric current which makes it difficult to transfer the DNA efficiently due to the temperature of the buffer used, so these machines can be either equipped with cooling machines or used in a cold area.
  5. Vacuum transfer: This method uses a buffer from the upper chamber to transfer the DNA from the gel to the nitrocellulose or nylon membrane, the gel is placed directly on the membrane, and the membrane is placed on a porous screen on the vacuum chamber.
6. Immobilization: The membrane is then baked in a vacuum or regular oven at 80 °C for 2 hours (standard conditions; nitrocellulose or nylon membrane) or exposed to ultraviolet radiation (nylon membrane) to permanently attach the transferred DNA to the membrane.
7. Hybridization: After that, a hybridization probe—a single DNA fragment with a particular sequence whose presence in the target DNA is to be ascertained—is exposed to the membrane. The probe DNA is labelled so that it can be detected, usually by incorporating radioactivity or tagging the molecule with a fluorescent or chromogenic dye. In some cases, the hybridization probe may be made from RNA, rather than DNA. To ensure the specificity of the binding of the probe to the sample DNA, most common hybridization methods use salmon or herring sperm DNA for blocking of the membrane surface and target DNA, deionized formamide, and detergents such as SDS to reduce non-specific binding of the probe.
8. Detection: After hybridization, excess probe is washed from the membrane (typically using SSC buffer), and the pattern of hybridization is visualized on X-ray film by autoradiography in the case of a radioactive or fluorescent probe, or by development of color on the membrane if a chromogenic detection method is used.

== Interpretation of results ==
Hybridization of the probe to a specific DNA fragment on the filter membrane indicates that this fragment contains a DNA sequence that is complementary to the probe. The transfer step of the DNA from the electrophoresis gel to a membrane permits easy binding of the labeled hybridization probe to the size-fractionated DNA. It also allows for the fixation of the target-probe hybrids, required for analysis by autoradiography or other detection methods. Southern blots performed with restriction enzyme-digested genomic DNA may be used to determine the number of sequences (e.g., gene copies) in a genome. A probe that hybridizes only to a single DNA segment that has not been cut by the restriction enzyme will produce a single band on a Southern blot, whereas multiple bands will likely be observed when the probe hybridizes to several highly similar sequences (e.g., those that may be the result of sequence duplication). To improve specificity and reduce hybridization of the probe to sequences that are less than 100% identical, the hybridization parameters may be changed (for instance, by raising the hybridization temperature or lowering the salt content). Nylon membrane is more durable and has higher binding capacity to DNA fragments than nitrocellulose membrane, so the DNA fragments will be more fixed to the membrane even when the membrane is incubated in high temperatures. In addition, compared to the nitrocellulose membrane which requires a high ionic strength buffer to bind the DNA fragments to the membrane, nylon charged membranes use buffers with very low ionic strength to transfer even small fragments of DNA of about 50 bp to the membrane, usually the DNA to be transferred is separated by polyacrylamide gel. In the blotting step the most efficient method to transfer the DNA from the gel to the membrane is the vacuum transfer since it transfers the DNA more rapidly and quantitatively.

== Applications ==
1. Southern blotting transfer may be used for homology-based cloning based on amino acid sequence of the protein product of the target gene. Oligonucleotides are designed so that they are complementary to the target sequence. The oligonucleotides are chemically synthesized, radiolabeled, and used to screen a DNA library, or other collections of cloned DNA fragments. Sequences that hybridize with the hybridization probe are further analyzed, for example, to obtain the full length sequence of the targeted gene.
2. Normal chromosomal or gene rearrangement can be studied using this technique.
3. Can be used to find similar sequences in other species or in the genome by decreasing the specificity of hybridization.
4. In a mixture having different sizes of digested DNA, it is used to identify the restriction fragment of a specific size.
5. It is useful in identifying changes that occur in genes including insertions, rearrangements, deletions, and point mutations that affect the restriction sites.
6. Moreover it is used to identify a specific region that uses many different restriction enzymes in a restriction mapping. Also it is used to determine which recognition site has been altered due to a single nucleotide polymorphism that changes a specific restriction enzyme.
7. Southern blotting can also be used to identify methylated sites in particular genes. Particularly useful are the restriction nucleases MspI and HpaII, both of which recognize and cleave within the same sequence. However, HpaII requires that a C within that site be methylated, whereas MspI cleaves only DNA unmethylated at that site. Therefore, any methylated sites within a sequence analyzed with a particular probe will be cleaved by the former, but not the latter, enzyme.
8. Can be used in personal identification through fingerprinting, and in disease diagnosis.

== Limitations ==
1. Compared to other tests, southern blot is a complex technique that has multiple steps and these steps require equipment and reagents that are expensive.
2. High quality and large amounts of DNA are needed.
3. Southern blotting is a time consuming method and can only estimate the size of the DNA since it is a semi-quantitative method.
4. It cannot be used to detect mutations at base-pair level.

== See also ==
- Gel electrophoresis of nucleic acids
- Restriction fragment
- Genetic fingerprint
- Northern blot
- Western blot
- Eastern blot
- Southwestern blot
- Northwestern blot
