= Far-western blot =

Molecular biology technique

The far-western blot, or far-western blotting, is a molecular biological method based on the technique of western blot to detect protein-protein interaction in vitro. Whereas western blot uses an antibody probe to detect a protein of interest, far-western blot uses a non-antibody probe which can bind the protein of interest. Thus, whereas western blotting is used for the detection of certain proteins, far-western blotting is employed to detect protein/protein interactions.

== Method ==
In conventional western blot, gel electrophoresis is used to separate proteins from a sample; these proteins are then transferred to a membrane in a 'blotting' step. In a western blot, specific proteins are then identified using an antibody probe.

Far-western blot employs non-antibody proteins to probe the protein of interest on the blot. In this way, binding partners of the probe (or the blotted) protein may be identified. The probe protein is often produced in E. coli using an expression cloning vector.

The probe protein can then be visualized through the usual methods — it may be radiolabelled; it may bear a specific affinity tag like His or FLAG for which antibodies exist; or there may be a protein specific antibody (to the probe protein).

Because cell extracts are usually completely denatured by boiling in detergent before gel electrophoresis, this approach is most useful for detecting interactions that do not require the native folded structure of the protein of interest.
