= Far-eastern blot =

Lipid analysis technique

The far-eastern blot, or far-eastern blotting, is a technique for the analysis of lipids separated by high-performance thin layer chromatography (HPTLC). When executing the technique, lipids are transferred from HPTLC plates to a PVDF membrane for further analysis, for example by enzymatic or ligand binding assays and mass spectrometry. It was developed in 1994 by Taki and colleagues at the Tokyo Medical and Dental University, Japan.

== Analysis ==
Cholesterol, glycerophospholipids and sphingolipids are major constituents of the cell membrane and in certain cases function as second messengers in cell proliferation, apoptosis and cell adhesion in inflammation and tumor metastasis. Far-eastern blot was established as a method for transferring lipids from an HPTLC plate to a polyvinylidene difluoride (PVDF) membrane within a minute. Applications of this with other methods have been studied. Far-eastern blotting allows for the purification of glycosphingolipids and phospholipids, structural analysis of lipids in conjunction with direct mass spectrometry, binding studies using various ligands such as antibodies, lectins, bacterium, viruses, and toxins, and enzyme reaction on membranes.

Far-eastern blot is adaptable to the analysis of lipids as well as metabolites of drugs and natural compounds from plants and environmental hormones.

== Etymology ==
The name is a dual reference to eastern blot and the geographical concept of the Far East (which includes Japan).
