= Edwin Southern =

English molecular biologist

Sir Edwin Southern FRS FRSE
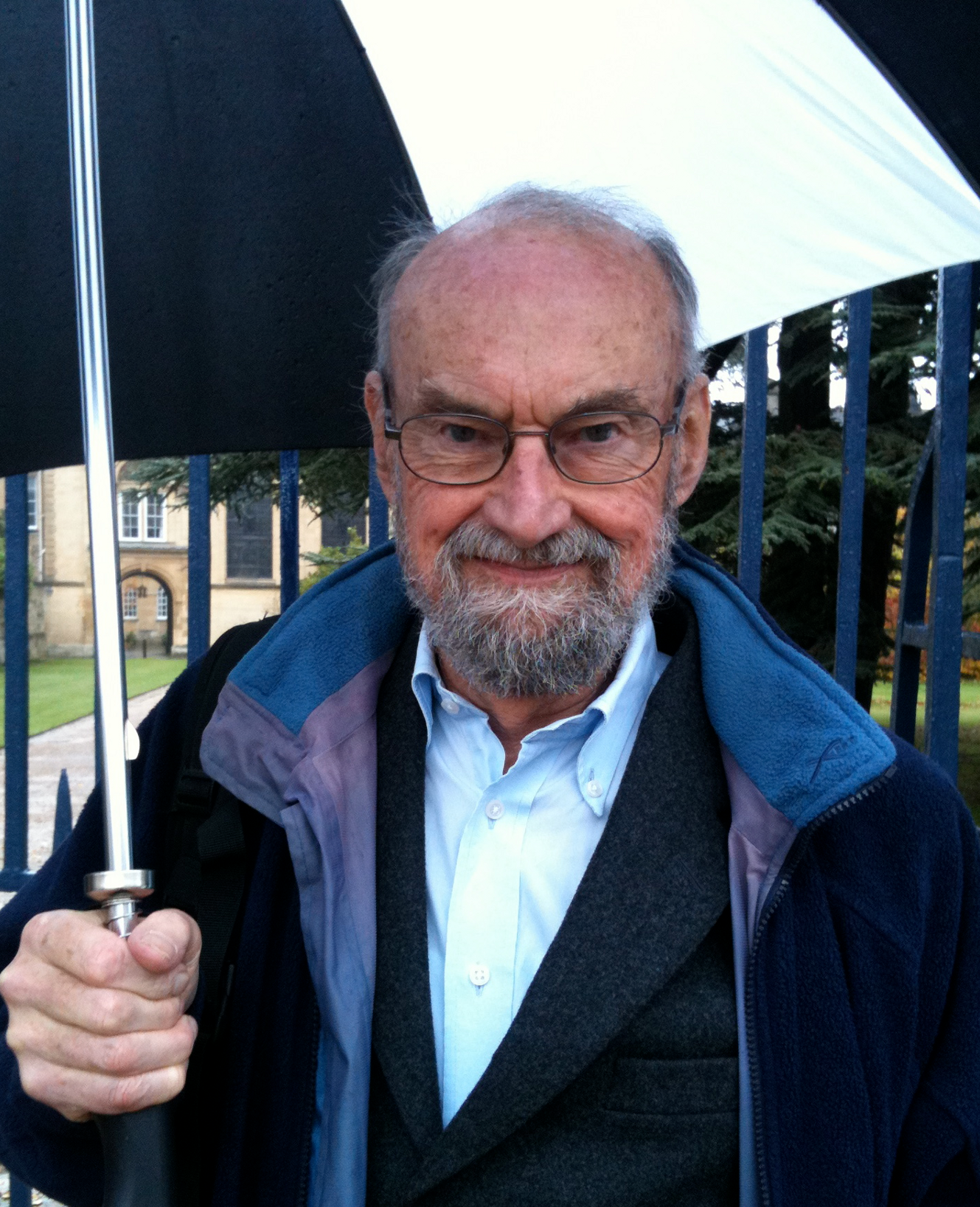
- Sir Edwin in 2012
- Born: Edwin Mellor Southern; 7 June 1938 (age 88); Burnley, United Kingdom
- Education: University of Manchester (BSc): University of Glasgow (PhD)
- Known for: Southern blot
- Awards: Gairdner award (1990); Royal Medal (1998); Lasker Award (2005)
- Scientific career
- Fields: Molecular Biology
- Workplaces: University of Oxford; University of Edinburgh; Oxford Gene Technology
- Thesis: Studies on synthetic and naturally occurring enzyme metabolites (1964)
- Doctoral students: Robin Allshire
- Website: www.ogt.co.uk/about/company/management/board_members/professor_sir_edwin_southern

Sir Edwin Mellor Southern FRS FRSE (born 7 June 1938) is an English Lasker Award-winning molecular biologist, Emeritus Professor of Biochemistry at the University of Oxford and a fellow of Trinity College, Oxford. He is most widely known for the invention of the Southern blot, published in 1975 and now a common laboratory procedure.

== Early life and education ==
Southern was born in Burnley, Lancashire and educated at Burnley Grammar School. He has a brother named John Southern and a sister Kay Monie. He went on to read Chemistry at the University of Manchester (BSc Hons., 1958). He continued as a graduate student (then Demonstrator, 1963) in the Department of Chemistry, University of Glasgow, where he was awarded his PhD in 1962.

== Career and research ==
Southern is also the founder and chairman of Oxford Gene Technology. He is also the founder (in 2000) and chairman of a Scottish charity, The Kirkhouse Trust, which aims to promote education and research in the Natural Sciences, particularly the biological and medical sciences, and the Edina Trust, which was founded to promote science in schools. These charities are financed using royalty income from licensing microarray technology.

=== Southern blot ===
The Southern blot is used for DNA analysis and was routinely used for genetic fingerprinting and paternity testing prior to the development of microsatellite markers for this purpose. The procedure is also frequently used to determine the number of copies of a gene in the genome. The concepts of the Southern blot were used in the development and creation of the modern microarray slide, which is an extensively used experimental tool. The northern blot, western blot and eastern blot, related procedures for the analysis of RNA, protein and post-translational modification of proteins, respectively, are all puns on Southern's name.

=== DNA microarray ===
Southern founded Oxford Gene Technology (OGT) in 1995, a company that developed DNA microarray technology. OGT won a 1999 patent infringement lawsuit against Affymetrix based on his patent holdings in microarray technology.

=== Awards and honours ===
In 1990, Southern was one of the winners of the Gairdner Foundation International Award. In 1998 he was awarded the Royal Medal of the Royal Society of London. He received the Association for Molecular Pathology Award for Excellence in Molecular Diagnostics in 1999. He was made a Knight Bachelor in the June 2003 Birthday Honours for services to the development of DNA microarray technologies. In 2005 he was awarded the prestigious Albert Lasker Award for Clinical Medical Research, jointly with Alec Jeffreys of the University of Leicester for his invention of the Southern blot. In 2005 he was also awarded the Association of Biomolecular Resource Facilities Award for outstanding contributions to Biomolecular Technologies. In 2012, he was elected an Honorary Fellow of the Royal Society of Edinburgh. His nomination for the Royal Society reads:

Dr. Southern has done pioneering work on the organization of DNA sequences in chromosomes. Apart from studies on crab poly-AT carried out in the early 1960s, Southern was the first to determine the nucleotide sequence of a eukaryotic chromosomal DNA fraction, demonstrating that a guinea pig 'satellite' had an unexpectedly simple repetitive structure based on a sequence of six nucleotides. In mouse satellite DNA he showed both short and long range periodicities. These and other studies on repetitive DNA he showed both short and long range periodicities. These and other studies on repetitive DNA sequences enabled him to suggest how non-coding chromosomal DNA may have evolved. Southern has devised valuable methods for DNA analysis. His 'blot' technique, for the identification of specific sequences among large populations of fragments generated by endonucleases, has found extremely widespread and important applications. He has also made important observations on the differential transcription of DNA sequences into RNA, and on patterns of DNA methylation.
