= Southwestern blot =

Molecular biology technique

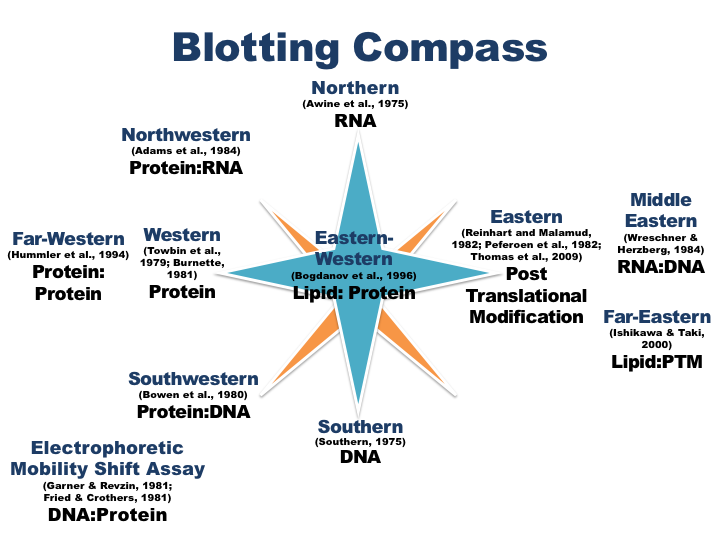
Compass Capturing the Various Blotting Techniques

The southwestern blot, is a lab technique that involves identifying as well as characterizing DNA-binding proteins by their ability to bind to specific oligonucleotide probes. Determination of molecular weight of proteins binding to DNA is also made possible by the technique. The name originates from a combination of ideas underlying Southern blotting and Western blotting techniques of which they detect DNA and protein respectively. Similar to other types of blotting, proteins are separated by SDS-PAGE and are subsequently transferred to nitrocellulose membranes. Thereafter southwestern blotting begins to vary with regard to procedure as since the first blotting’s, many more have been proposed and discovered with goals of enhancing results. Former protocols were hampered by the need for large amounts of proteins and their susceptibility to degradation while being isolated.

Southwestern blotting was first described by Brian Bowen, Jay Steinberg, U.K. Laemmli, and Harold Weintraub in 1979. During the time the technique was originally called "protein blotting". While there were existing techniques for purification of proteins associated with DNA, they often had to be used together to yield desired results. Thus, Bowen and colleagues sought to describe a procedure that could simplify the current methods of their time.

== Method ==
=== Original Method ===
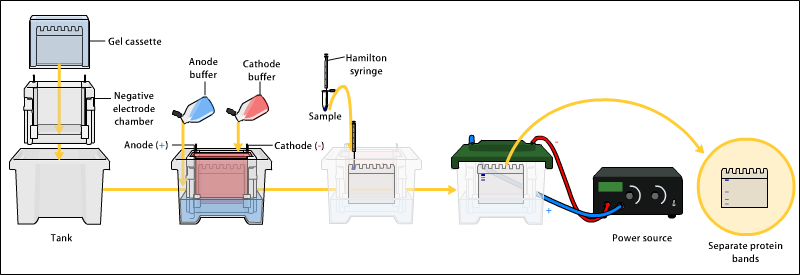
General Sketch of SDS-PAGE Electrophoresis

To begin, proteins of interest are prepared for the SDS-PAGE technique and subsequently loaded onto the gel for separation on the basis of molecular size. Large proteins will have difficulty navigating through the mesh-like structure of the gel as they can not fit through the pores with the ease that smaller proteins can. As a result, large proteins do not travel very far on the gel in comparison to smaller proteins that travel further. After enough time, this results in distinct bands that can be visualized from a number of post-gel electrophoresis staining procedures. The bands are at different positions on the gel relative to the well that they were loaded into.

Next, proteins are to be renatured followed by the gel being subjected to pressed between two nitrocellulose filters which rely on diffusion to transfer the proteins from the gel to the membrane filters. At this point replicas of the gel have been created of which each serves a particular purpose. One membrane filter can be stained to see the protein bands that were created from gel electrophoresis and the other is used in the actual process of hybridizing with prepared ^{32}P radioactively labeled specific oligonucleotide probes. To detect any protein-DNA interactions, autoradiography is commonly used.

=== Southwestern Blot Mapping ===
"Southwestern blot mapping" is a time-efficient way of identifying DNA-binding proteins and specific sites on the genomic DNA that they interact with.

1. First, proteins are prepared with a mixture that exposes them to the denaturing sodium dodecyl sulfate (SDS) agent. This exposure not only converts the proteins from a folded conformation to an unfolded conformation but also establishes uniform charge among them as well contributing to the ease of separation on a size basis using polyacrylamide gel (PAGE).
2. Second, in contrast to the previous step, proteins on the resulting gel are to be renatured by removal of SDS. This serves to bring the proteins back to the form that ideally maximizes interactions later on in the procedure.
3. Third, blotting takes place onto nitrocellulose membranes using methods for and properties of diffusion.
4. Fourth, shifting to probe creation, particular restriction enzymes are chosen and used on the region of DNA under study to produce fragments of appropriate but different sizes.
5. Fifth, the fragments are radioactively labeled and given appropriate time for binding to previously prepared blots. Once this time has elapsed, the blots are washed to remove any DNA that was not able to bind.
6. Finally, the specifically-bound DNA is eluted from each individual protein-DNA complex and analyzed by another application of polyacrylamide gel electrophoresis.

== Results ==
After time is allowed for binding with the oligonucleotide probes, the hope is that some of the proteins on the membrane filter have bound to the probes. Any probe that was not able to bind a protein needs to be removed. Once unbound probe removal has been taken care of, to better visualize the membrane filter, it is subjected to further varying procedures. By corresponding the resulting membrane filter to the second membrane filter that the gel was sandwiched between, the position of the protein in comparison to the molecular weight ladder gives information about the weight of the protein that bound to the probe.

=== Method Modifications ===
- Instead of relying on standard diffusion to transfer the proteins from the gel to the filter, electroblotting is commonly used because it removes the denaturing agent SDS thereby allowing the proteins to renature as they move to the filter.
- Skim milk is added to the filter before hybridizing with probes as it contains Bovine Serum Albumin (BSA) which prevents any unwanted or weak interactions of DNA to the nitrocellulose membrane.
- A rapid dimethylsulphate (DMS) protection assay can be used to identify non-specific binding vs. specific binding on blots.
- During the DNA probe hybridization step, defined amounts of salt are used to enhance specific interactions that occur between the DNA and proteins.

== Advantages, Disadvantages, Potential ==
=== Advantages ===
- Given the ability of southwestern blotting towards studying the affinity of proteins towards binding to DNA, this information can further be used with regard to uncovering specific protein factors that bind to DNA as well. These protein factors may be involved in controlling gene expression.
- Unlike electrophoretic mobility shift and DNA foot printing, determination of molecular weight of unknown proteins that bind to DNA can occur.
- Bowen and colleagues not only experimented and demonstrated a procedure for detecting DNA-binding proteins but also procedures for RNA-binding proteins as well as histone-binding proteins.
- Results can be combined with mass spectrometry to assist in DNA-binding protein identification.
- Isoelectric point determination is possible through the use of 2D-SDS-PAGE instead of the standard one dimension.

=== Disadvantages ===
- Since the technique involves the use of SDS-PAGE which utilizes the effect that sodium-dodecyl sulfate has on proteins which is to denature them, there is the possibility of dissociating protein factors that possess multiple subunits through the process. This could end up affecting how well the protein factor binds to DNA in later steps of the technique.
- Not all proteins renature during the transfer process to the nitrocellulose membranes after separation via SDS-PAGE. This area of protein renaturation is still being experimented with.
- Also being experimented with is reusability of southwestern blots to test proteins with a variety of DNA probes before disposal. However, the main challenge is putting together a scheme that outlines conditions that can remove previously used probes from the blot without the expense of denaturing the proteins or extracting them.

=== Potential ===
- Overcoming the reusability challenge with the blots, can allow for the use of a particular oligonucleotide probe where the radioactive labeling is varied to study the degree of binding that mutants of the probe possess with proteins.
- Oligonucleotides are not able to penetrate the gel of SDS-PAGE to bind to the proteins which stresses the importance of having the blotting step. However, it may not be needed if "protein-resolving-oligonucleotide-permeable" gels are created. With such gels, oligonucleotide probes of interest could enter the gels and bind to the proteins minimizing steps of the technique while keeping results in one place.
- There is evidence that tissue-specific DNA binding proteins can be identified by use of southwestern blot mapping. Moreover, their sequence-specific binding allows the purification of the corresponding selectively bound DNA fragments and may improve protein-mediated cloning of DNA regulatory sequences.
