= Differential display =

Differential display (also referred to as DDRT-PCR or DD-PCR) is a laboratory technique that allows a researcher to compare and identify changes in gene expression at the mRNA level between two or more eukaryotic cell samples. It was the most commonly used method to compare expression profiles of two eukaryotic cell samples in the 1990s. By 2000, differential display was superseded by DNA microarray approaches.

In differential display, first all the RNA in each sample is reverse transcribed using a set of 3′ "anchored primers" (having a short sequence of deoxy-thymidine nucleotides at the end) to create a cDNA library for each sample, followed by PCR amplification using arbitrary 3′ primers for cDNA strand amplification together with anchored 3′ primers for RNA strand amplification, identical to those used to create the library; about forty arbitrary primers is the optimal number to transcribe almost all of the mRNA. The resulting transcripts are then separated by electrophoresis and visualized, so that they can be compared. The method was prone to error due to different mRNAs migrating into single bands, differences in less abundant mRNAs getting drowned by more abundant mRNAs, sensitivity to small changes in cell culture conditions, and a tendency to amplify 3′ fragments rather than full mRNAs, and the necessity to use about 300 primers to catch all the mRNA. The method was first published in Science in 1992.
